= South Run =

South Run may refer to:

- South Run (Bowman Creek), a tributary of Bowman Creek in Wyoming County, Pennsylvania
- South Run, Virginia, a census-designated place in Fairfax County
