= York Run =

River in Pennsylvania, United States

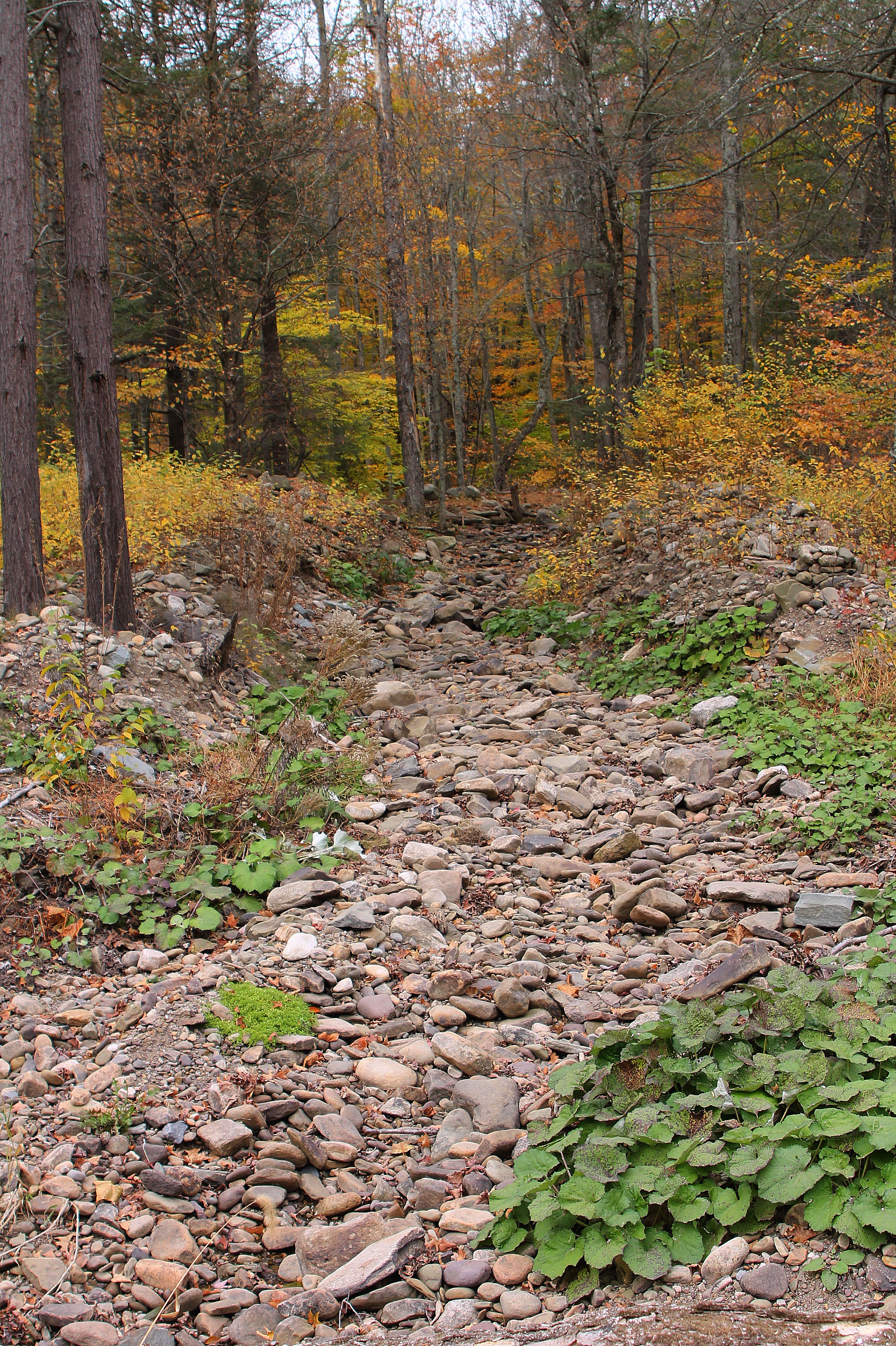
- York Run looking upstream near its mouth

Physical characteristics
- Source
  - location: edge of a plateau in Noxen Township, Wyoming County, Pennsylvania
  - elevation: between 2,060 and 2,080 feet (628 and 634 m)
- Mouth
  - location: Bowman Creek in Noxen Township, Wyoming County, Pennsylvania
  - coordinates: 41°25′39″N 76°04′01″W
  - elevation: 1,014 ft (309 m)
- Length: 2.3 mi (3.7 km)
- Basin size: 1.42 sq mi (3.7 km^{2})

Basin features
- Progression: Bowman Creek → Susquehanna River → Chesapeake Bay

York Run is a tributary of Bowman Creek in Wyoming County, Pennsylvania, in the United States. It is approximately 2.3 miles (3.7 km) long and flows through Noxen Township. The watershed of the creek has an area of 1.42 square miles (3.7 km^{2}). The surficial geology in its vicinity consists of alluvium, Wisconsinan Till, alluvial fan, and Wisconsinan Ice-Contact Stratified Drift. The watershed of the stream is designated as a High-Quality Coldwater Fishery and a Migratory Fishery and the stream is Class A Wild Trout Waters.

== Course ==
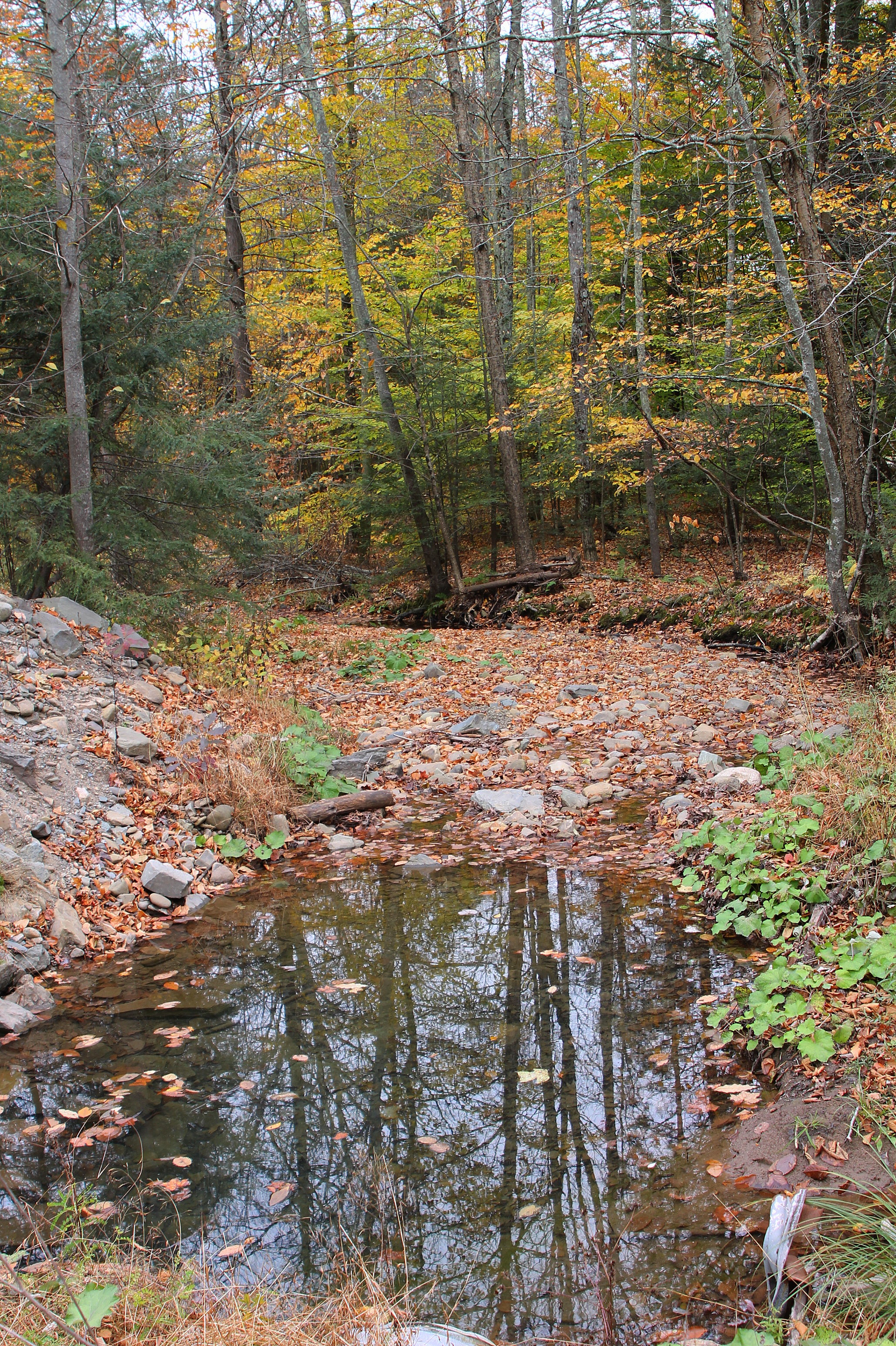
York Run looking downstream near its mouth

York Run begins near the edge of a plateau in Noxen Township. It flows east-northeast for a short distance as its valley becomes much deeper. The stream then turns east-southeast for several tenths of a mile before turning south-southeast. After several tenths of a mile, it reaches the border of the census-designated place of Noxen. It flows along the border of Noxen in a south-southeasterly direction for several tenths of a mile before reaching its confluence with Bowman Creek.

York Run joins Bowman Creek 14.00 miles (22.53 km) upstream of its mouth.

== Hydrology ==
York Run is not designated as an impaired waterbody. The concentration of alkalinity in York Run is 12 milligrams per liter (0.012 oz/cu ft).

Mehoopany Wind Energy, LLC. once applied for and/or received a National Pollutant Discharge Elimination System to discharge stormwater into York Run during construction activities.

== Geography and geology ==
The elevation near the mouth of York Run is 1,014 feet (309 m) above sea level. The elevation of the stream's source is between 2,060 and 2,080 feet (628 and 634 m) above sea level.

The surficial geology near the mouth of York Run mainly consists of alluvium, alluvial fan, and Wisconsinan Ice-Contact Stratified Drift. Further upstream, the surficial geology consists of Wisconsinan Till and alluvium, but bedrock consisting of sandstone and shale is also in the area.

== Watershed ==
The watershed of York Run has an area of 1.42 square miles (3.7 km^{2}). The stream is entirely within the United States Geological Survey quadrangle of Noxen.

The entire length of York Run is on private land that is closed to access.

== History ==
York Run was entered into the Geographic Names Information System on August 2, 1979. Its identifier in the Geographic Names Information System is 1199825.

== Biology ==
The drainage basin of York Run is designated as a High-Quality Coldwater Fishery and a Migratory Fishery. Wild trout naturally reproduce in the stream from its headwaters downstream to its mouth. It is designated by the Pennsylvania Fish and Boat Commission as Class A Wild Trout Waters for brook trout from its headwaters downstream to its mouth.

In 2002, the lichen species Biatora longispora and Biatora printzenii, of the genus Biatora were observed in the vicinity of York Run.

== See also ==
- Hettesheimer Run, next tributary of Bowman Creek going downstream
- Stone Run (Bowman Creek), next tributary of Bowman Creek going upstream
- List of rivers of Pennsylvania
- List of tributaries of Bowman Creek
