= Roaring Run (Bowman Creek tributary) =

River in Pennsylvania, United States

Roaring Run Roaring Creek
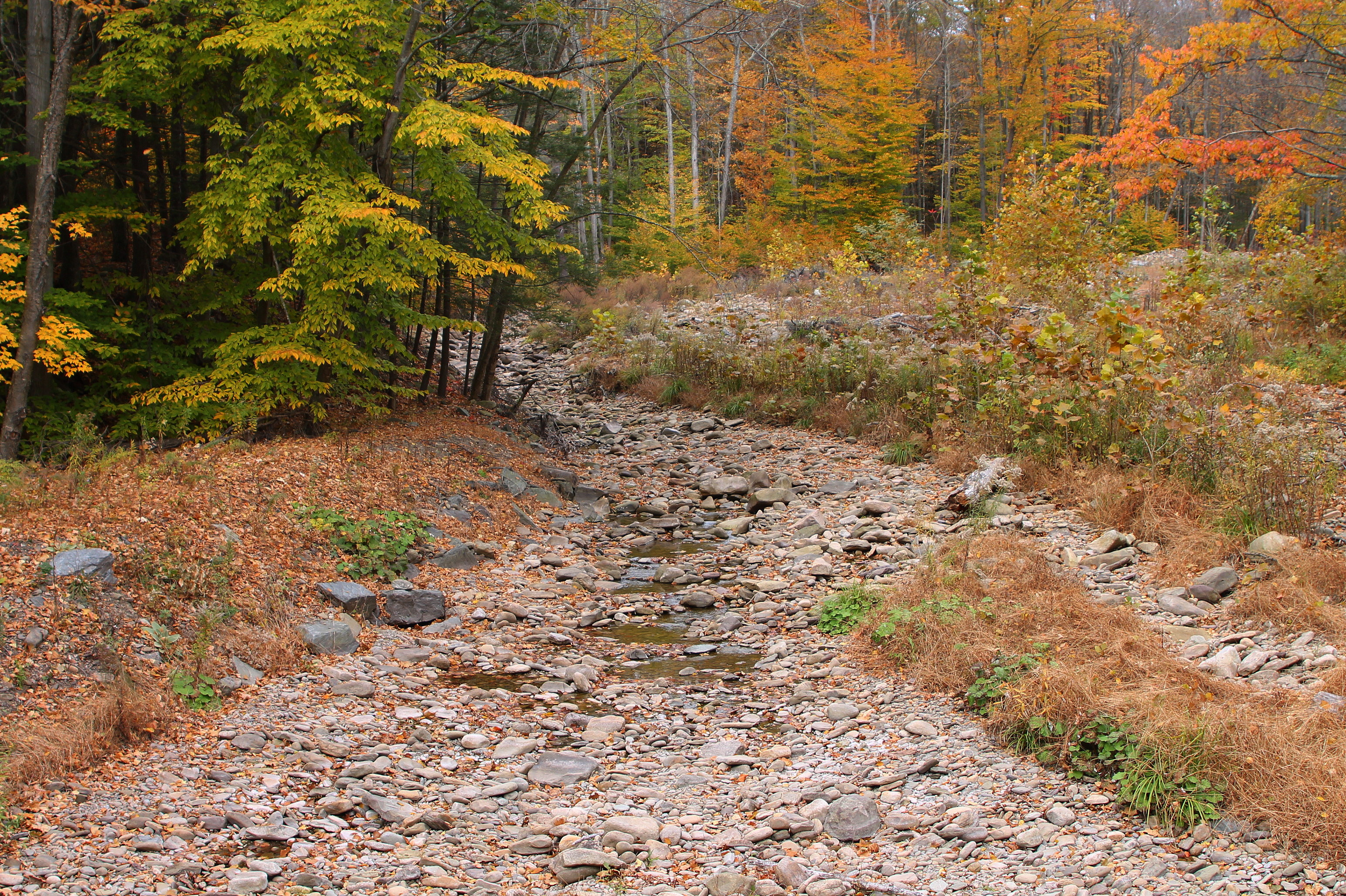
- Roaring Run looking upstream in its lower reaches from Pennsylvania Route 29

Physical characteristics
- Source
  - location: deep valley on Forkston Mountain in Forkston Township, Wyoming County, Pennsylvania
  - elevation: between 1,960 and 1,980 feet (597 and 604 m)
- Mouth
  - location: Bowman Creek in Monroe Township, Wyoming County, Pennsylvania
  - coordinates: 41°27′27″N 76°01′42″W
  - elevation: 791 ft (241 m)
- Length: 4.9 mi (7.9 km)
- Basin size: 11.4 mi^{2} (30 km^{2})

Basin features
- Progression: Bowman Creek → Susquehanna River → Chesapeake Bay
- Tributaries
  - left: Newton Run
  - right: South Branch Roaring Run

Roaring Run (also known as Roaring Creek) is a tributary of Bowman Creek in Wyoming County, Pennsylvania, in the United States. It is approximately 4.9 miles (7.9 km) long and flows through Forkston Township, Noxen Township, and Monroe Township. It has two named tributaries: Newton Run and South Branch Roaring Run. The watershed of Roaring Run has an area of 11.4 square miles (30 km^{2}). It is designated as a High-Quality Coldwater Fishery and a Migratory Fishery and the stream is Class A Wild Trout Waters. The surficial geology in its vicinity consists of alluvium, alluvial terrace, alluvial fan, bedrock, Wisconsinan Till, and Wisconsinan Ice-Contact Stratified Drift. A bridge carrying Pennsylvania Route 29 crosses the stream.

== Course ==
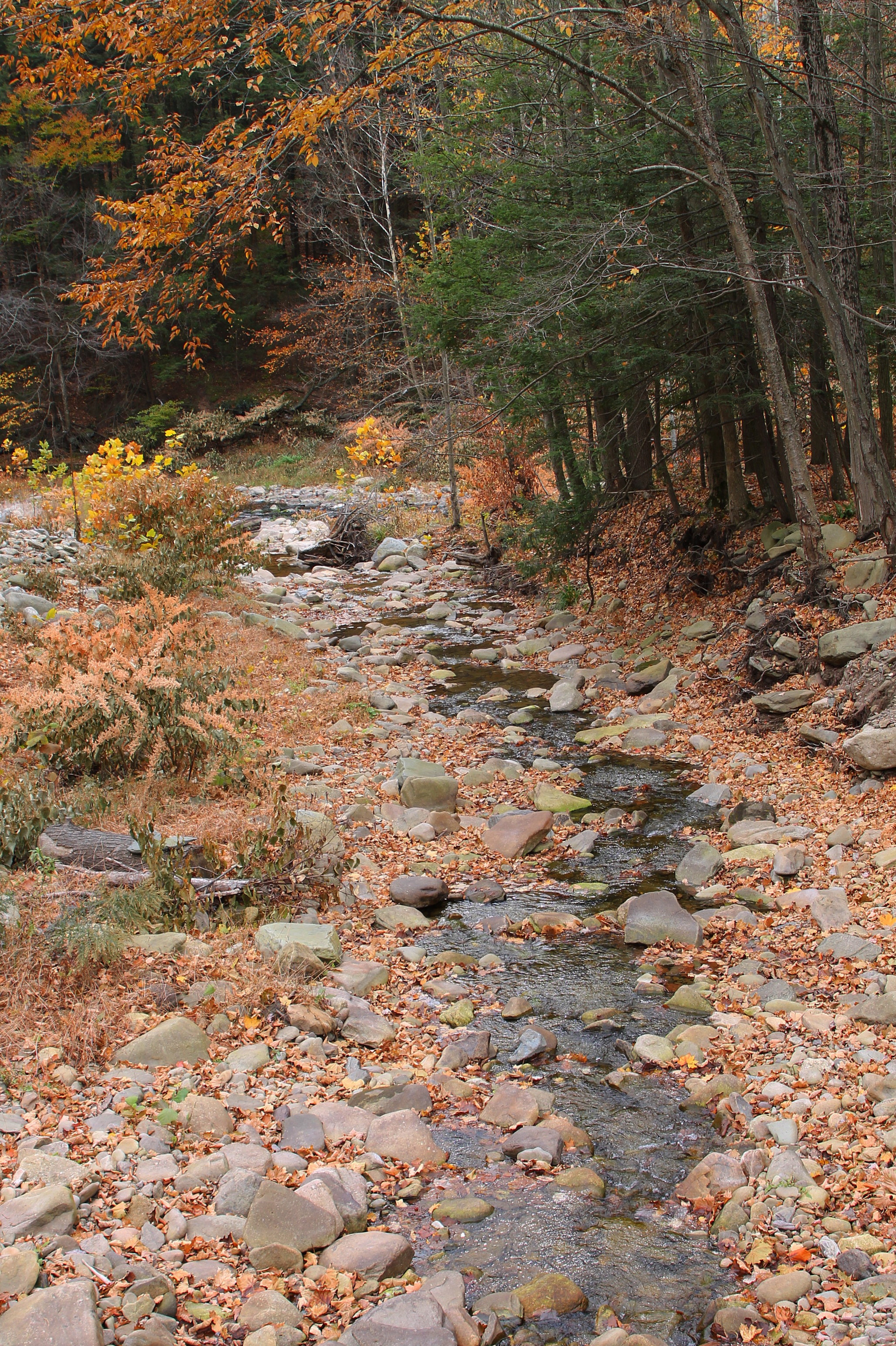
Roaring Run looking downstream in its lower reaches from Pennsylvania Route 29

Roaring Run begins in a deep valley on Forkston Mountain in Forkston Township. It flows south through its valley for several tenths of a mile before turning south-southeast. The stream continues flowing through its deep valley in this direction for more than a mile before receiving South Branch Roaring Run, its first named tributary, from the right. Its valley then broadens slightly and it turns southeast for several tenths of a mile before entering Noxen Township. Here, the stream turns east-northeast for a short distance before east-southeast and receiving the tributary Newton Run from the left. The creek then leaves its valley and turns southeast for several hundred feet before turning south. A few tenths of a mile further downstream, it crosses Pennsylvania Route 29 and reaches its confluence with Bowman Creek.

Roaring Run joins Bowman Creek 8.49 miles (13.66 km) upstream of its mouth.

=== Tributaries ===
Roaring Run has two named tributaries: Newton Run and South Branch Roaring Run. Newton Run joins Roaring Run 0.42 miles (0.68 km) upstream of its mouth and drains an area of 2.55 square miles (6.6 km^{2}). South Branch Roaring Run joins Roaring Run 2.34 miles (3.77 km) upstream of its mouth and drains an area of 3.31 square miles (8.6 km^{2}).

== Hydrology ==
The alkalinity of Roaring Run upstream of the tributary South Branch Roaring Run is 10 milligrams per liter (0.0100 oz/cu ft). Downstream of South Branch Roaring Run, the concentration increases to 11 milligrams per liter (0.011 oz/cu ft).

== Geography and geology ==
The elevation near the mouth of Roaring Run is 791 feet (241 m) above sea level. The elevation of the stream's source is between 1,960 and 1,980 feet (597 and 604 m) above sea level.

In its lower reaches, Roaring Run flows through a band where the surficial geology consists of alluvium. This area is flanked by areas with a surficial geology consisting of alluvial terrace and alluvial fan. Further upstream, the alluvium continues and is flanked by alluvial fan, Wisconsinan Ice-Contact Stratified Drift, Wisconsinan Till, and bedrock consisting of sandstone and shale. The surficial geology near the stream's headwaters features Wisconsinan Till and bedrock.

In the Holocene Period, sediment from Roaring Run has forced Bowman Creek's channel to remain on the south side of its valley. This causes Bowman Creek to cut into bedrock, forming Evans Falls 0.1 miles (0.16 km) downstream of the mouth of Roaring Run.

== Watershed ==
The watershed of Roaring Run has an area of 11.4 square miles (30 km^{2}). The stream is entirely within the United States Geological Survey quadrangle of Noxen. Part of it is approximately 6 miles (9.7 km) from the village of Forkston.

The entire length of Roaring Run is on private land that is closed to access. The stream is located in the vicinity of the community of Noxen.

Roaring Run is one of the major tributaries of Bowman Creek.

== History ==
Roaring Run was entered into the Geographic Names Information System on August 2, 1979. Its identifier in the Geographic Names Information System is 1199392. The stream is also known as Roaring Creek.

In 1880, a portable steam mill was being erected on Roaring Run.

A concrete tee beam bridge carrying Pennsylvania Route 29 over Roaring Run was built in 1939. This bridge is 49.9 feet (15.2 m) long and is located in Monroe Township.

The channel of Roaring Run has experienced damage during flooding on January 25, 2010. However, the Wyoming County Conservation District received a $125,000 grant from the Pennsylvania Department of Environmental Protection to repair it and four other stream channels in the area.

== Biology ==
The drainage basin of Roaring Run is designated as a High-Quality Coldwater Fishery and a Migratory Fishery. Wild trout naturally reproduce in the stream from its headwaters downstream to its mouth. From its headwaters downstream to the confluence of South Branch Roaring Run, a distance of approximately 2.6 miles (4.2 km), Roaring Run is designated by the Pennsylvania Fish and Boat Commission as Class A Wild Trout Waters for brook trout. From South Branch Roaring Run downstream to its mouth, a distance of approximately 2.4 miles (3.9 km), Roaring Run is classified as Class A Wild Trout Waters for both brook trout and rainbow trout.

Roaring Run is the only wild brook trout/rainbow trout fishery in Pennsylvania.

== See also ==
- Marsh Creek (Bowman Creek), next tributary of Bowman Creek going downstream
- Leonard Creek, next tributary of Bowman Creek going upstream
- List of rivers of Pennsylvania
- List of tributaries of Bowman Creek
