= Beaver Run (Bowman Creek tributary) =

River in Pennsylvania, United States

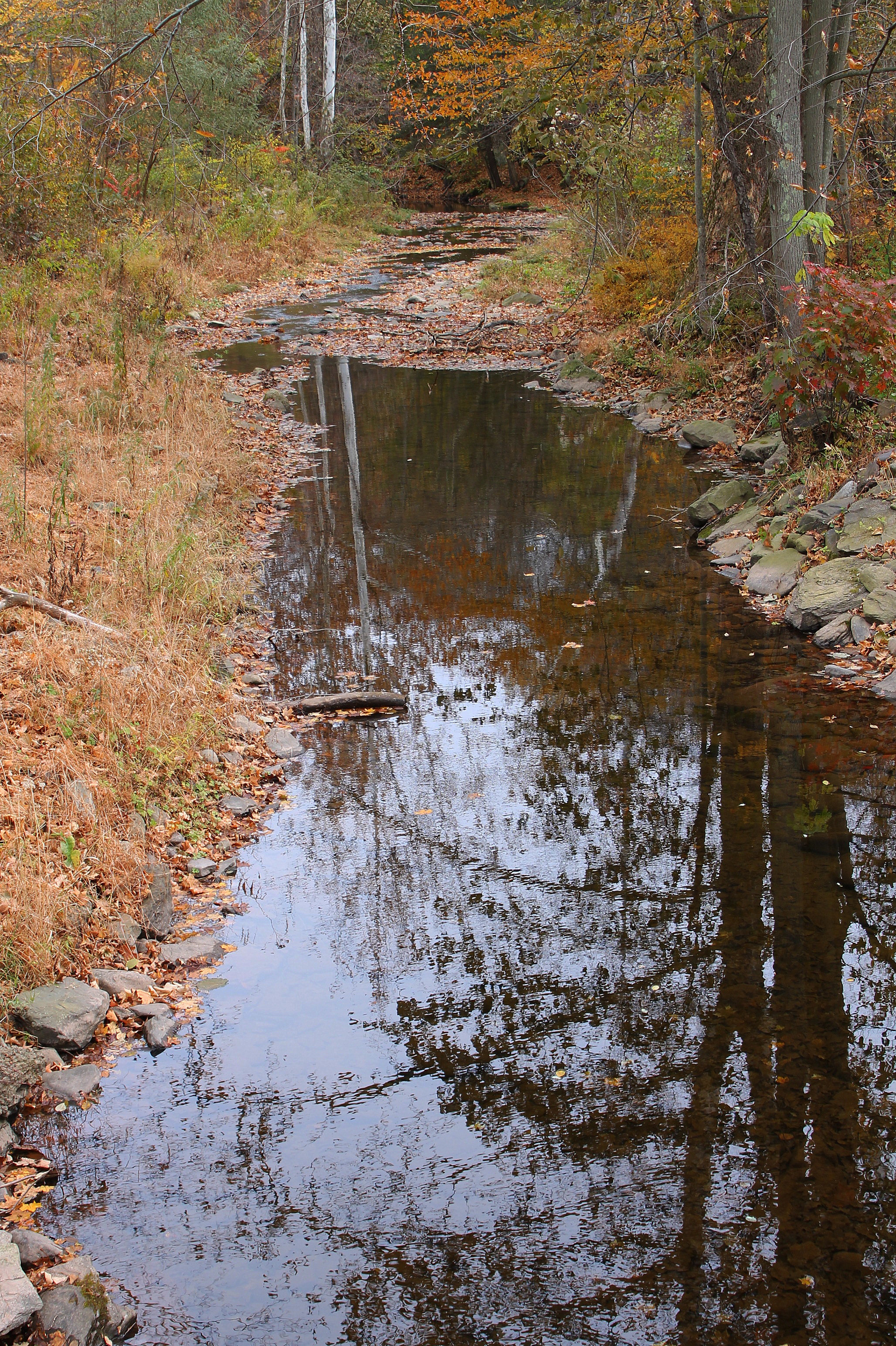
- Beaver Run looking downstream near its mouth in Noxen

Physical characteristics
- Source
  - location: wetland on Kocher Mountain in Lake Township, Luzerne County, Pennsylvania
  - elevation: between 2,100 and 2,120 feet (640 and 646 m)
- Mouth
  - location: Bowman Creek in Noxen Township, Pennsylvania
  - coordinates: 41°24′57″N 76°02′42″W
  - elevation: 948 ft (289 m)
- Length: 7.7 mi (12.4 km)
- Basin size: 10.6 mi^{2} (27 km^{2})

Basin features
- Progression: Bowman Creek → Susquehanna River → Chesapeake Bay
- Tributaries
  - left: two unnamed tributaries
  - right: two unnamed tributaries

Beaver Run is a tributary of Bowman Creek in Luzerne County and Wyoming County, in Pennsylvania, in the United States. It is approximately 7.7 miles (12.4 km) long and flows through Lake Township in Luzerne County and Noxen Township in Wyoming County. The watershed of the stream has an area of 10.6 square miles (27 km^{2}). It is not designated as an impaired waterbody. The surficial geology in its vicinity includes alluvial fan, alluvial terrace, alluvium, Wisconsinan Till, Wisconsinan Ice-Contact Stratified Drift, fill, wetlands, and bedrock.

Beaver Run is a source of flooding in Lake Township, Luzerne County. A number of bridges have also been constructed over Beaver Run. The watershed of the stream is designated as a High Quality Coldwater Fishery and a Migratory Fishery.

== Course ==
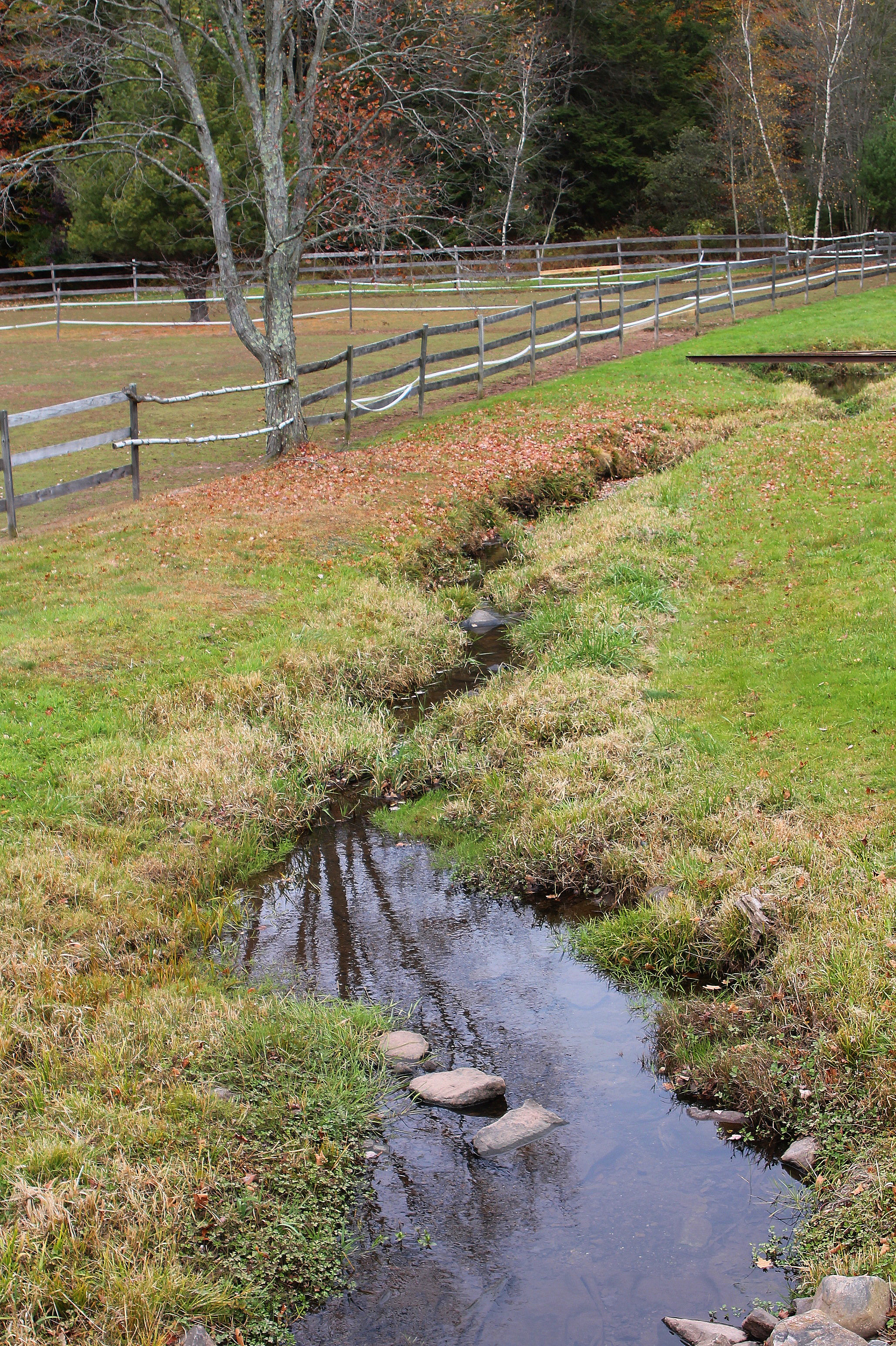
Beaver Run looking downstream in its upper reaches

Beaver Run begins in a wetland on Kocher Mountain in Lake Township, Luzerne County. It flows east-southeast for several tenths of a mile before turning south and then east. Several tenths of a mile further downstream, the stream reaches the base of the mountain and turns north-northeast, flowing through a valley. It heads in this direction for a few miles, flowing alongside Pennsylvania Route 29, receiving two unnamed tributaries from the left, and passing through a wetland after its valley broadens. The stream then exits Lake Township and Luzerne County.

Upon exiting Luzerne County, Beaver Run enters Noxen Township, Wyoming County. It heads in a northeasterly direction near Sorber Mountain for several tenths of a mile before receiving an unnamed tributary from the right and turning north-northwest, still flowing alongside the mountain. The stream then turns north, crossing Pennsylvania Route 29 and passing between Sorber Mountain and Grassy Ridge. After more than a mile, it enters the census-designated place of Noxen and turns northeast before leaving its valley and turning east. After several tenths of a mile, the stream gradually turns east-southeast, and several tenths of a mile after that, it reaches its confluence with Bowman Creek.

Beaver Run joins Bowman Creek 12.36 miles (19.89 km) upstream of its mouth.

== Hydrology ==
Beaver Run is not designated as an impaired waterbody.

At Greenbriar Road, where Beaver Run drains 2.35 square miles (6.1 km^{2}), the stream's peak annual discharge has a 10 percent chance of reaching 468 cubic feet per second (13.3 m^{3}/s). It has a 2 percent chance of reaching 853 cubic feet per second (24.2 m^{3}/s) and a 1 percent chance of reaching 1,065 cubic feet per second (30.2 m^{3}/s). The peak annual discharge has a 0.2 percent chance of reaching 1,692 cubic feet per second (47.9 m^{3}/s).

== Geography and geology ==
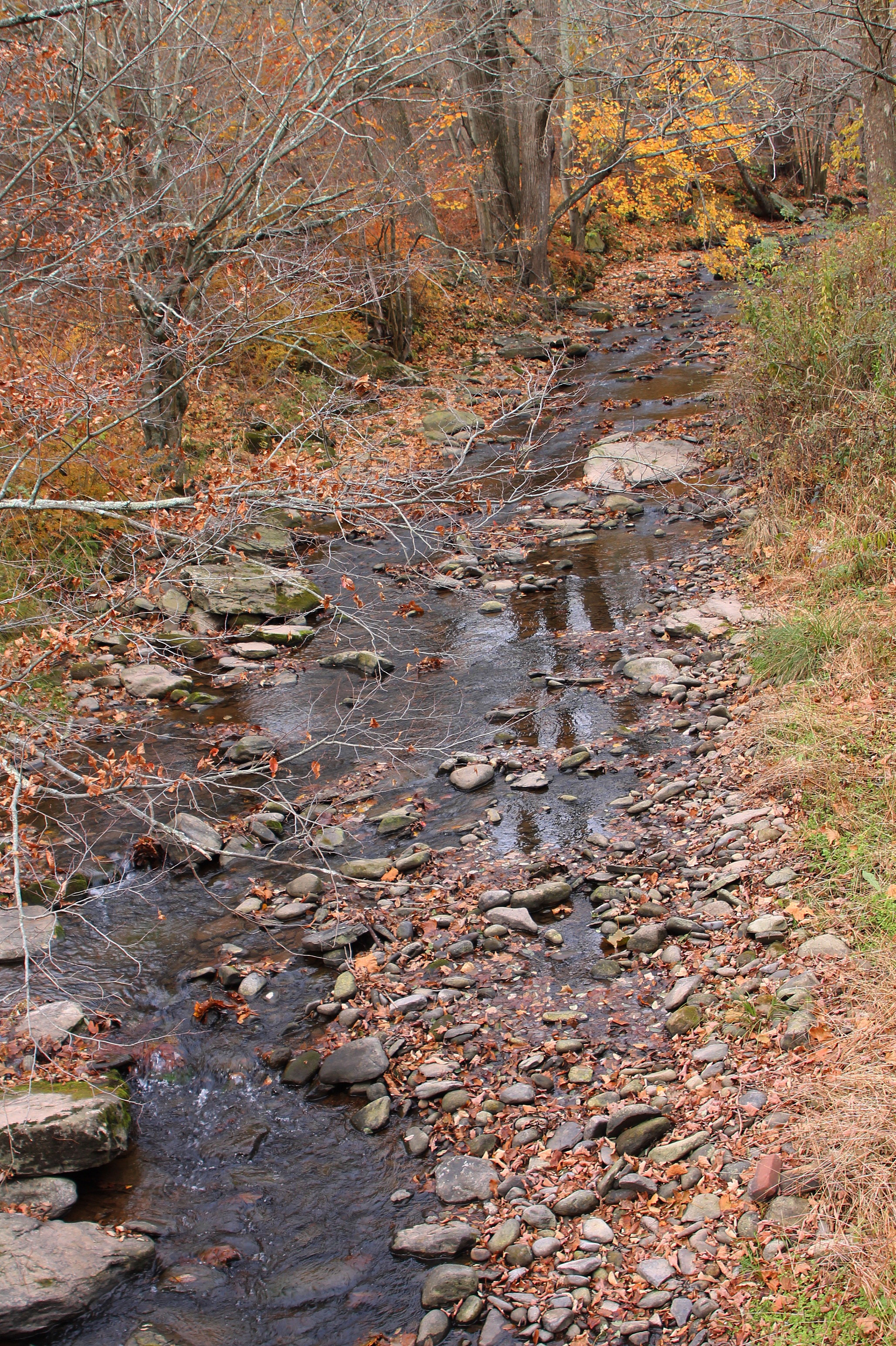
Beaver Run looking upstream near its mouth

The elevation near the mouth of Beaver Run is 948 feet (289 m) above sea level. The elevation of the stream's source is between 2,100 and 2,120 feet (640 and 646 m) above sea level.

The surficial geology near the mouth of Beaver Run mainly consists of alluvial terrace, alluvium, and a till known as Wisconsinan Till. The latter two types of surficial geology are also common further upstream, as is Wisconsinan Ice-Contact Stratified Drift. There are also some patches of wetland, alluvial fan, fill, and bedrock consisting of sandstone and shale. The surficial geology further upstream also includes many of these features.

In preglacial times, Harveys Lake, the largest natural lake in Pennsylvania by volume, drained into Beaver Run and Bowman Creek. However, Harveys Lake now drains into Harveys Creek instead. During the Ice Age, glaciers receding northeast in the valley of Bowman Creek to the village of Noxen opened the mouth of the valley of Beaver Run, causing the Glacial Lake Beaver Run to become a branch of Glacial Lake Bowman.

== Watershed ==
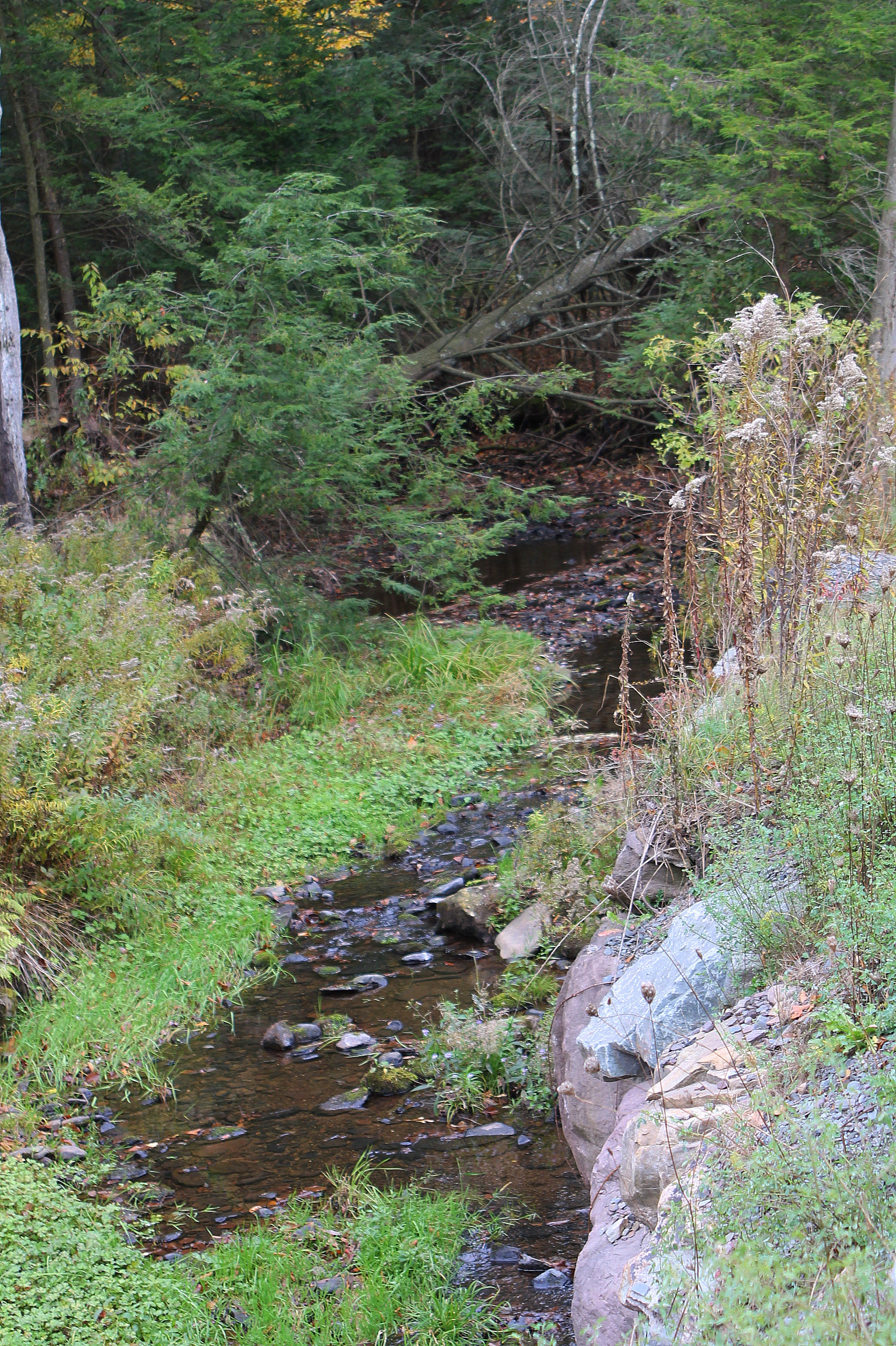
Beaver Run looking upstream in its upper reaches

The watershed of Beaver Run has an area of 10.6 square miles (27 km^{2}). The mouth of the stream is in the United States Geological Survey quadrangle of Noxen. However, its source is in the quadrangle of Harveys Lake.

Some land infringes upon the 100-year floodplain of Beaver Run and at least one of its tributaries.

Beaver Run is one of several major sources of flooding in Lake Township, Luzerne County, with other sources including Harveys Creek, Pikes Creek, and Fades Creek. However, flooding along Beaver Run and the other streams has not caused much damage, as the township is relatively undeveloped.

== History ==
Beaver Run was entered into the Geographic Names Information System on August 2, 1979. Its identifier in the Geographic Names Information System is 1198391.

Historically, the Lewis log train linked with the Lehigh Valley Railroad at Beaver Run, next Noxen. In the late 1800s, a two-span iron bridge replaced a trestle over the stream.

A steel stringer/multi-beam or girder bridge carrying T-327 (Maple Street) over Beaver Run was built 0.75 miles (1.21 km) southeast of Noxen in 1943 and was repaired in 2010. This bridge is 26.9 feet (8.2 m) long. A prestressed box beam or girders bridge carrying T-337 (Beaver Street) was built over the stream in Noxen in 2009 and is 29.9 feet (9.1 m) long.

In 2006, Beaver Run was proposed as a flood debris cleanup site.

== Biology ==
The drainage basin of Beaver Run is designated as a High-Quality Coldwater Fishery and a Migratory Fishery. Wild trout naturally reproduce in the stream from its headwaters downstream to its mouth. Reaches of the stream have in the past been stocked with brook trout.

== See also ==
- South Run (Bowman Creek), next tributary of Bowman Creek going downstream
- Hettesheimer Run, next tributary of Bowman Creek going upstream
- List of rivers of Pennsylvania
- List of tributaries of Bowman Creek
