= Hettesheimer Run =

River in Pennsylvania, United States

Hettesheimer Run Hettesheimer's Run
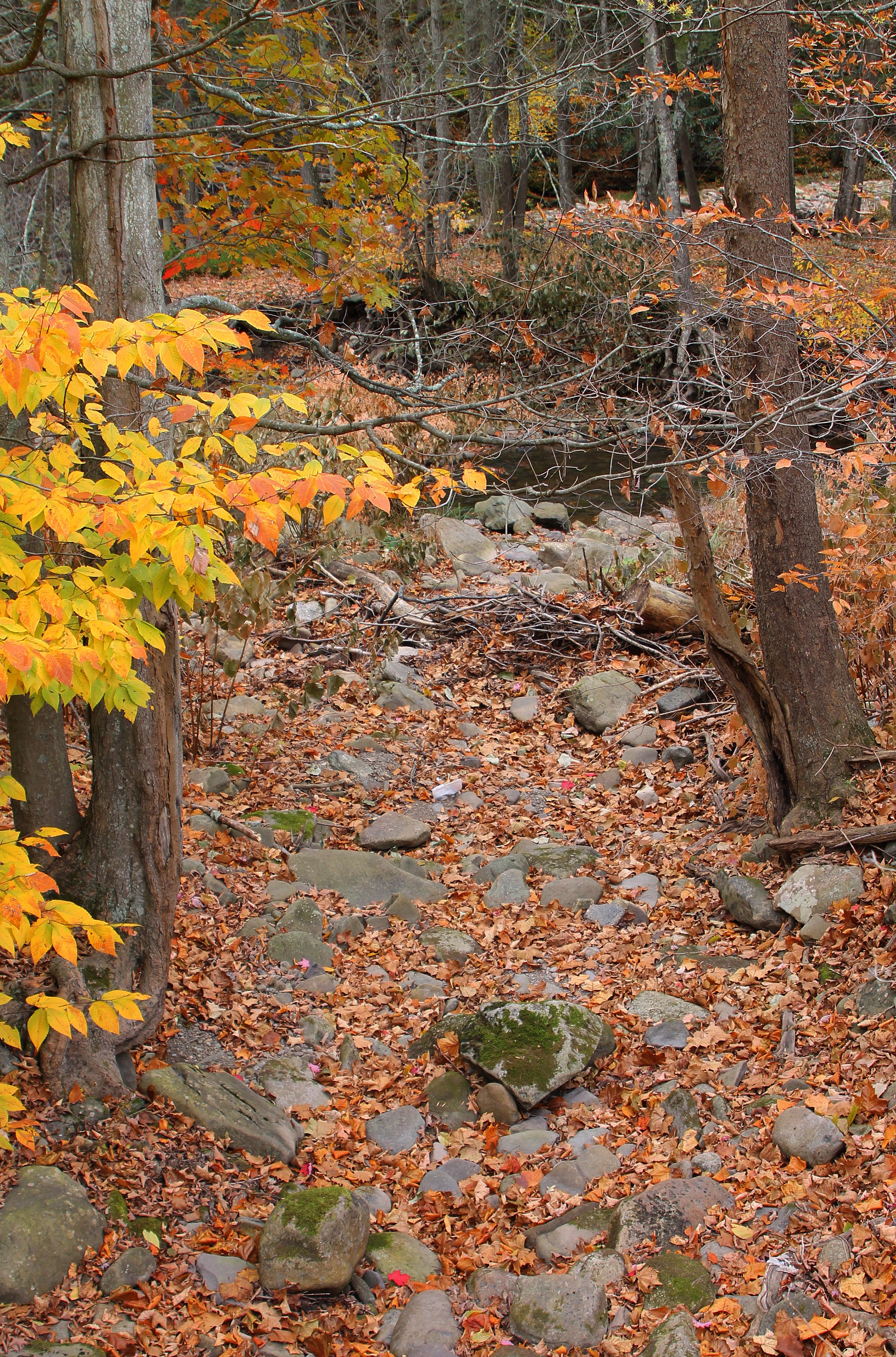
- Hettesheimer Run near its mouth

Physical characteristics
- Source
  - location: valley to the west of Schooley Mountain in Noxen Township, Pennsylvania
  - elevation: between 1,520 and 1,540 feet (463 and 469 m)
- Mouth
  - location: Bowman Creek in Noxen in Noxen Township, Pennsylvania
  - coordinates: 41°25′37″N 76°03′52″W
  - elevation: 1,004 ft (306 m)
- Length: 1.6 mi (2.6 km)
- Basin size: 1.94 mi^{2} (5.0 km^{2})

Basin features
- Progression: Bowman Creek → Susquehanna River → Chesapeake Bay

Hettesheimer Run (also known as Hettesheimer's Run) is a tributary of Bowman Creek in Wyoming County, Pennsylvania, in the United States. It is approximately 1.6 miles (2.6 km) long and flows through Noxen Township. The watershed of the stream has an area of 1.94 square miles (5.0 km^{2}). It is not designated as an impaired waterbody. The stream was historically used as an industrial water supply. Its watershed is designated as a High-Quality Coldwater Fishery and a Migratory Fishery and the stream is Class A Wild Trout Waters.

== Course ==
Hettsheimer Run begins in a valley to the west of Schooley Mountain in Noxen Township. It flows southeast through the valley for several tenths of a mile before turning south-southeast. After several tenths of a mile, the stream turns south-southwest and enters the census-designated place of Noxen. It then exits its valley and reaches its confluence with Bowman Creek.

Hettesheimer Run joins Bowman Creek 13.84 miles (22.27 km) upstream of its mouth.

== Hydrology ==
Hettesheimer Run is not designated as an impaired waterbody. The concentration of alkalinity in Hettesheimer Run is 12 milligrams per liter (0.012 oz/cu ft).

== Geography and geology ==
The elevation near the mouth of Hettesheimer Run is 1,004 feet (306 m) above sea level. The elevation of the stream's source is between 1,520 and 1,540 feet (463 and 469 m) above sea level.

The surficial geology in the vicinity of the mouth of Hettesheimer Run consists of alluvial fan, alluvial terrace, alluvium, and Wisconsinan Ice-Contact Stratified Drift. Further upstream, the surficial geology along the stream consists of alluvium, while Wisconsinan Till is also in the area. The surficial geology in the stream's middle and upper reaches consists of Wisconsinan Till, but bedrock consisting of sandstone and shale occurs near its valley.

== Watershed ==
The watershed of Hettesheimer Run has an area of 1.94 square miles (5.0 km^{2}). The stream is entirely within the United States Geological Survey quadrangle of Noxen.

Some reaches of Hettesheimer Run are within 300 feet (91 m) of a road.

== History ==
Hettesheimer Run was entered into the Geographic Names Information System on August 2, 1979. Its identifier in the Geographic Names Information System is 1198877. The stream is also known as Hettesheimer's Run.

A Native American site, possibly a rock shelter has been discovered at the confluence of Hettesheimer Run with Bowman Creek.

In the early 1900s, Hettesheimer Run was used as an industrial water supply at Noxen. In the early 1900s, the Department of Fisheries closed part or all of the stream.

In 2005, the Pennsylvania Fish and Boat Commission discussed the addition of Hettesheimer Run to its list of Class A Wild Trout Waters.

== Biology ==
The drainage basin of Hettesheimer Run is designated as a High-Quality Coldwater Fishery and a Migratory Fishery. Wild trout naturally reproduce in the stream from its headwaters downstream to its mouth. The stream is classified by the Pennsylvania Fish and Boat Commission as Class A Wild Trout Waters for brook trout from its headwaters downstream to its mouth.

A snake species known as Diadophis punctatus edwardsii was observed in the vicinity of Hettesheimer Run in 1956.

== See also ==
- Beaver Run (Bowman Creek), next tributary of Bowman Creek going downstream
- York Run, next tributary of Bowman Creek going upstream
- List of rivers of Pennsylvania
- List of tributaries of Bowman Creek
