= List of tributaries of Bowman Creek =

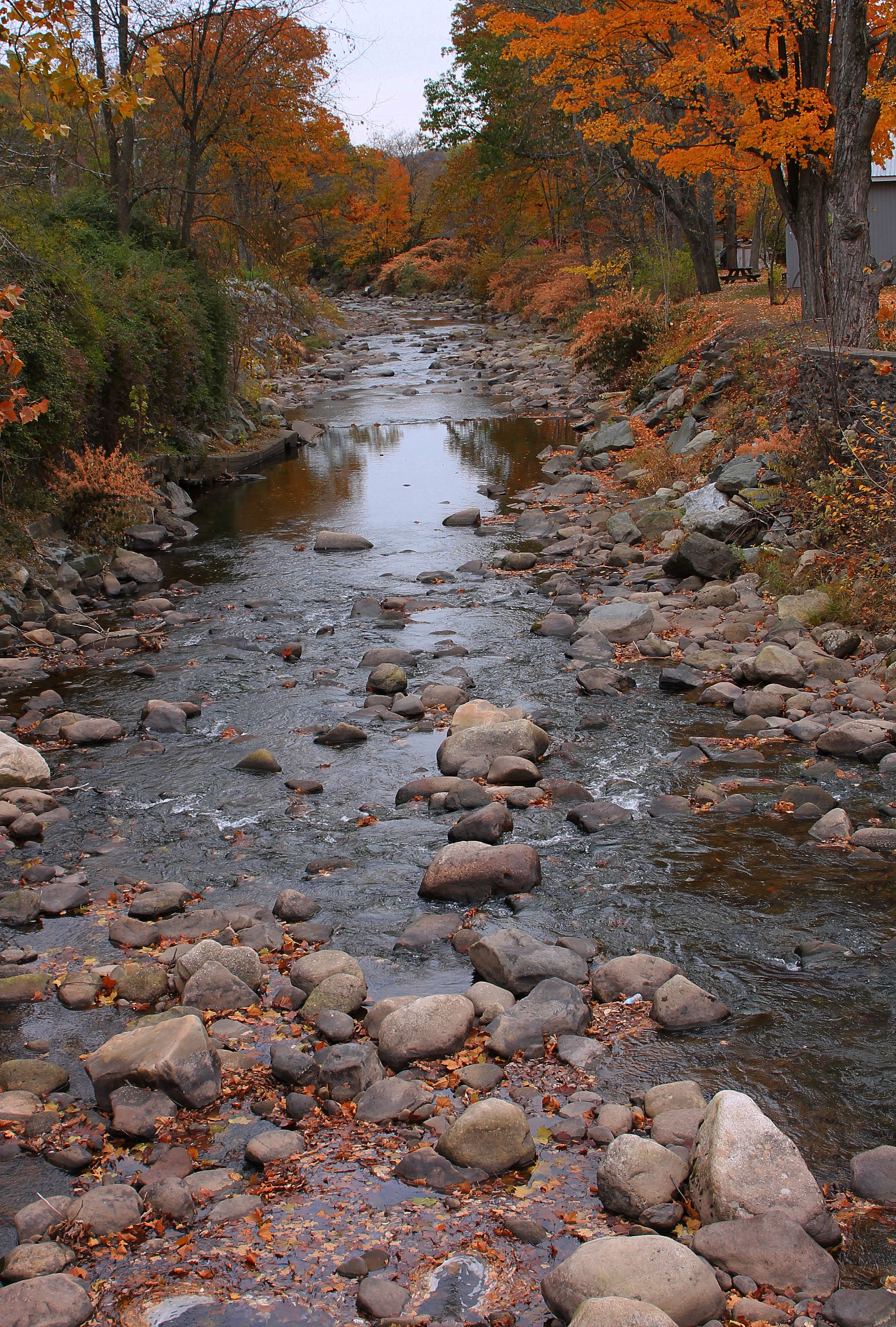
Bowman Creek looking downstream in Noxen, between the tributaries Hettesheimer Run and Beaver Run

Bowman Creek is a 26-mile (42 km) long tributary of the Susquehanna River in Luzerne County and Wyoming County, in Pennsylvania, in the United States. It has 26 named tributaries, of which 21 are direct tributaries and 5 are sub-tributaries. These include nineteen runs, six creeks, and one hollow (a stream that does not have a name of its own, but takes the name of the valley through which it flows). By length, the tributaries range from the 0.9-mile (1.4 km) long Benson Hollow and Wolf Run to the 7.2-and-7.7-mile (11.6 and 12.4 km) long Leonard Creek and Beaver Run. By watershed area, they range from 0.74 and 1.02 square miles (1.9 and 2.6 km^{2}) for Wolf Run and Sugar Run to 11.4 and 17.4 square miles (30 and 45 km^{2}) for Roaring Run and Leonard Creek.

The major tributaries of Bowman Creek include Sugar Hollow Creek, Marsh Creek, Leonard Creek, Roaring Run, and Beaver Run. Although the watershed of Bowman Creek largely consists of forested land, residential and commercial land infringes upon the floodplains of several tributaries: Marsh Creek, Leonard Creek, South Run, and Beaver Run.

Bowman Creek's main stem is designated as a High-Quality Coldwater Fishery and the watersheds of all but two of its tributaries have the same designation. The watersheds of the remaining two tributaries, Sorber Run and Cider Run, are designated as Exceptional Value waters, with standards even higher than those of High-Quality Coldwater Fisheries. Additionally, these two tributaries are the only Wilderness Trout Streams in Wyoming County. Wild trout naturally reproduce throughout all of the creek's tributaries. A total of ten named streams in the watershed of Bowman Creek are classified by the Pennsylvania Fish and Boat Commission as Class A Wild Trout Waters. Most hold this designation for brook trout only, but Sugar Hollow Creek and a section of Roaring Run hold the designation for rainbow trout, either instead of or in addition to brook trout.

== Tributaries of Bowman Creek ==
Name	Length	Watershed area	Distance from mouth	Mouth elevation	Source elevation	Mouth coordinates	Image
Benson Hollow	0.9 miles (1.4 km)	1.82 square miles (4.7 km^{2})	1.72 miles (2.77 km)	584 feet (178 m)	1,340 to 1,360 feet (408 to 415 m)	41°30′57″N 75°56′40″W	
Sugar Hollow Creek	4.7 miles (7.6 km)	7.07 square miles (18.3 km^{2})	2.62 miles (4.22 km)	636 feet (194 m)	1,380 to 1,400 feet (421 to 427 m)	41°30′26″N 75°59′07″W	
Marsh Creek	5.6 miles (9.0 km)	10.2 square miles (26 km^{2})	5.60 miles (9.01 km)	712 feet (217 m)	1,160 to 1,180 feet (354 to 360 m)	41°28′25″N 75°59′24″W	
Roaring Run	4.9 miles (7.9 km)	11.4 square miles (30 km^{2})	8.49 miles (13.66 km)	791 feet (241 m)	1,960 to 1,980 feet (597 to 604 m)	41°27′26″N 76°01′41″W	
Leonard Creek	7.2 miles (11.6 km)	17.4 square miles (45 km^{2})	10.00 miles (16.09 km)	837 feet (255 m)	1,200 to 1,220 feet (366 to 372 m)	41°26′26″N 76°01′10″W	
South Run	2.5 miles (4.0 km)	3.42 square miles (8.9 km^{2})	11.68 miles (18.80 km)	899 feet (274 m)	1,180 to 1,200 feet (360 to 366 m)	41°25′16″N 76°01′58″W	
Beaver Run	7.7 miles (12.4 km)	10.6 square miles (27 km^{2})	12.36 miles (19.89 km)	948 feet (289 m)	2,100 to 2,120 feet (640 to 650 m)	41°24′56″N 76°02′41″W	
Hettesheimer Run	1.6 miles (2.6 km)	1.94 square miles (5.0 km^{2})	13.84 miles (22.27 km)	1,004 feet (306 m)	1,520 to 1,540 feet (463 to 469 m)	41°25′36″N 76°03′53″W	
York Run	2.3 miles (3.7 km)	1.42 square miles (3.7 km^{2})	14.00 miles (22.53 km)	1,014 feet (309 m)	2,060 to 2,080 feet (628 to 634 m)	41°25′40″N 76°04′00″W	
Stone Run	2.2 miles (3.5 km)	2.43 square miles (6.3 km^{2})	15.56 miles (25.04 km)	1,109 feet (338 m)	2,200 to 2,220 feet (671 to 677 m)	41°25′06″N 76°05′18″W	
Sorber Run	3.1 miles (5.0 km)	2.08 square miles (5.4 km^{2})	16.25 miles (26.15 km)	1,142 feet (348 m)	1,940 to 1,960 feet (591 to 597 m)	41°24′34″N 76°05′38″W	
Baker Run	1.1 miles (1.8 km)	2.28 square miles (5.9 km^{2})	17.58 miles (28.29 km)	1,227 feet (374 m)	1,560 to 1,580 feet (475 to 482 m)	41°24′03″N 76°06′53″W	
Broad Hollow Run	1.0 mile (1.6 km)	1.04 square miles (2.7 km^{2})	17.70 miles (28.49 km)	1,234 feet (376 m)	1,500 to 1,520 feet (457 to 463 m)	41°23′57″N 76°06′56″W	
Sugar Run	1.8 miles (2.9 km)	1.02 square miles (2.6 km^{2})	19.68 miles (31.67 km)	1,358 feet (414 m)	1,960 to 1,980 feet (597 to 604 m)	41°23′02″N 76°08′31″W	
Cider Run	2.5 miles (4.0 km)	3.77 square miles (9.8 km^{2})	19.74 miles (31.77 km)	1,362 feet (415 m)	1,940 to 1,960 feet (591 to 597 m)	41°23′03″N 76°08′35″W	
Butternut Run	1.5 miles (2.4 km)	1.30 square miles (3.4 km^{2})	20.62 miles (33.18 km)	1,440 feet (440 m)	2,060 to 2,080 feet (628 to 634 m)	41°22′24″N 76°08′55″W	
Beth Run	1.9 miles (3.1 km)	2.34 square miles (6.1 km^{2})	21.97 miles (35.36 km)	1,598 feet (487 m)	1,980 to 2,000 feet (604 to 610 m)	41°21′38″N 76°09′48″W	
Wolf Run	0.9 miles (1.4 km)	0.74 square miles (1.9 km^{2})	24.04 miles (38.69 km)	1,736 feet (529 m)	2,140 to 2,160 feet (652 to 658 m)	41°21′05″N 76°11′38″W	
Bean Run	1.3 miles (2.1 km)	1.69 square miles (4.4 km^{2})	24.98 miles (40.20 km)	1,811 feet (552 m)	2,080 to 2,100 feet (634 to 640 m)	41°21′01″N 76°12′15″W	
North Branch Bowman Creek	3.2 miles (5.1 km)	2.63 square miles (6.8 km^{2})	26.13 miles (42.05 km)	1,837 feet (560 m)	2,240 to 2,260 feet (683 to 689 m)	41°20′25″N 76°13′13″W	
South Branch Bowman Creek	3.0 miles (4.8 km)	3.92 square miles (10.2 km^{2})	26.13 miles (42.05 km)	1,837 feet (560 m)	2,160 to 2,180 feet (658 to 664 m)	41°20′25″N 76°13′13″W	

=== Sub-tributaries ===
Name	Tributary to	Length	Watershed area	Distance from mouth	Mouth elevation	Source elevation	Coordinates	Image
Sugar Run	Marsh Creek	1.3 miles (2.1 km)	1.36 square miles (3.5 km^{2})	2.24 miles (3.60 km)	932 feet (284 m)	1,320 to 1,340 feet (402 to 408 m)	41°27′15″N 75°59′02″W	
Newton Run	Roaring Run	2.7 miles (4.3 km)	2.55 square miles (6.6 km^{2})	0.42 miles (0.68 km)	856 feet (261 m)	1,980 to 2,000 feet (604 to 610 m)	41°27′44″N 76°01′53″W	
South Branch Roaring Run	Roaring Run	2.0 miles (3.2 km)	3.31 square miles (8.6 km^{2})	2.34 miles (3.77 km)	1,112 feet (339 m)	2,000 to 2,020 feet (610 to 616 m)	41°28′22″N 76°03′40″W	
Windfall Run	Baker Run	1.6 miles (2.6 km)	1.68 square miles (4.4 km^{2})	0.66 miles (1.06 km)	1,365 feet (416 m)	2,200 to 2,220 feet (671 to 677 m)	41°24′15″N 76°07′21″W	
Cherry Run	South Branch Bowman Creek	2.1 miles (3.4 km)	1.65 square miles (4.3 km^{2})	1.25 miles (2.01 km)	1,900 feet (580 m)	2,280 to 2,300 feet (695 to 701 m)	41°20′20″N 76°14′31″W	

== See also ==
- List of rivers of Pennsylvania
