= South Branch Roaring Run =

River in Pennsylvania, United States

Physical characteristics
- Source
  - location: valley to the southeast of South Mountain, in Noxen Township, Pennsylvania
  - elevation: between 2,000 and 2,020 feet (610 and 616 m)
- Mouth
  - location: Roaring Run in Forkston Township, Wyoming County, Pennsylvania
  - coordinates: 41°28′22″N 76°03′39″W
  - elevation: 1,112 ft (339 m)
- Length: 2.0 mi (3.2 km)
- Basin size: 3.31 mi^{2} (8.6 km^{2})

Basin features
- Progression: Roaring Run → Bowman Creek → Susquehanna River → Chesapeake Bay

South Branch Roaring Run is a tributary of Roaring Run in Wyoming County, Pennsylvania, in the United States. It is approximately 2.0 miles (3.2 km) long and flows through Noxen Township and Forkston Township. The watershed of the stream has an area of 3.31 square miles (8.6 km^{2}). The surficial geology in its vicinity consists of bedrock, Wisconsinan Till, Wisconsinan Bouldery Till, Wisconsinan Ice-Contact Stratified Drift, and alluvium. South Branch Roaring Run is classified as Class A Wild Trout Waters.

== Course ==
South Branch Roaring Run begins in a valley in Noxen Township, to the southeast of South Mountain. It flows north-northeast for several tenths of a mile before turning northeast. After several tenths of a mile, the stream enters Forkston Township and turns east-northeast for several tenths of a mile. It then reaches its confluence with Roaring Run.

South Branch Roaring Run joins Roaring Run 2.34 miles (3.77 km) upstream of its mouth.

== Hydrology ==
The concentration of alkalinity in South Branch Roaring Run is 5 milligrams per liter (0.0050 oz/cu ft). Mehoopany Wind Energy, LLC once applied for and/or received a permit to discharge stormwater from construction work into the stream.

== Geography and geology ==
The elevation near the mouth of South Branch Roaring Run is 1,112 feet (339 m) above sea level. The elevation of the stream's source is between 2,000 and 2,020 feet (610 and 616 m) above sea level.

The valley of South Branch Roaring Run is located between South Mountain and Schooley Mountain.

The surficial geology along the lower reaches of South Branch Roaring Run mainly consists of bedrock consisting of sandstone and shale. However, there is also alluvium, Wisconsinan Till, and Wisconsinan Ice-Contact Stratified Dirft in the area. Further upstream, the surficial geology in the stream's vicinity consists of Wisconsinan Bouldery Till, but there is bedrock and Wisconsinan Till in the area.

== Watershed ==
The watershed of South Branch Roaring Run has an area of 3.31 square miles (8.6 km^{2}). The stream is entirely within the United States Geological Survey quadrangle of Noxen. The entire length of the stream is on private land that is closed to access.

== History ==
South Branch Roaring Run was entered into the Geographic Names Information System on August 2, 1979. Its identifier in the Geographic Names Information System is 1199564.

== Biology ==
Wild trout naturally reproduce in South Branch Roaring Run from its headwaters downstream to its mouth. The stream is designated by the Pennsylvania Fish and Boat Commission as Class A Wild Trout Waters for brook trout from its headwaters downstream to its mouth. The stream is classified as a High-Quality Coldwater Fishery and a Migratory Fishery.

== See also ==
- Newton Run, next tributary of Roaring Run going downstream
- List of rivers of Pennsylvania
- List of tributaries of Bowman Creek
