= Leonard Creek =

Tributary of Bowman Creek in Pennsylvania, US

Leonard Creek Leonards Creek, Leonard's Creek
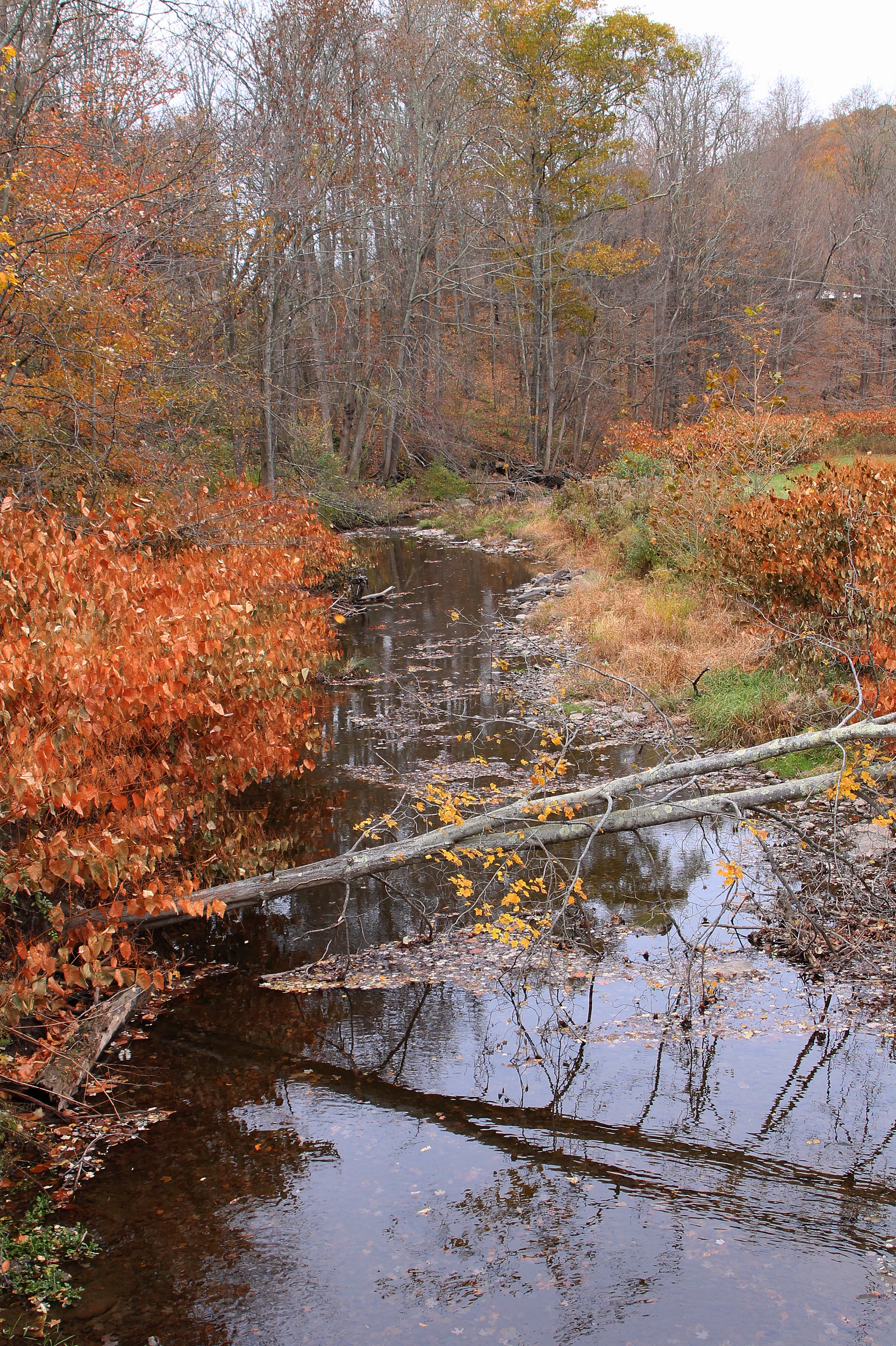
- Leonard Creek looking downstream

Physical characteristics
- Source
  - location: Dallas Township, Luzerne County, Pennsylvania
  - elevation: between 1,200 and 1,220 feet (366 and 372 m)
- Mouth
  - location: Bowman Creek in Monroe Township, Wyoming County, Pennsylvania
  - coordinates: 41°26′26″N 76°01′10″W
  - elevation: 837 ft (255 m)
- Length: 7.2 mi (11.6 km)
- Basin size: 17.1 mi^{2} (44 km^{2})

Basin features
- Progression: Bowman Creek → Susquehanna River → Chesapeake Bay
- Tributaries
  - left: one unnamed tributary
  - right: six unnamed tributaries

Leonard Creek (also known as Leonards Creek or Leonard's Creek) is a tributary of Bowman Creek in Luzerne County and Wyoming County, in Pennsylvania, in the United States. It is approximately 7.2 miles (11.6 km) long and flows through Dallas Township in Luzerne County and Monroe Township in Wyoming County. The watershed of the creek has an area of 17.1 square miles (44 km^{2}). The creek is not designated as an impaired waterbody. The surficial geology in its vicinity consists of Wisconsinan Till, alluvium, Wisconsinan Ice-Contact Stratified Drift, alluvial fan, alluvial terrace, bedrock, and sand and gravel pits.

Major land uses in the watershed of Leonard Creek include forested land and agricultural land. The creek is one of the more significant tributaries of Bowman Creek. Leonard Creek has at times been impacted by flooding. A number of mills historically existed along the creek and a number of bridges have been constructed across it. The creek's watershed is classified as a High-Quality Coldwater Fishery and a Migratory Fishery. One of its unnamed tributaries is designated as Class A Wild Trout Waters.

== Course ==
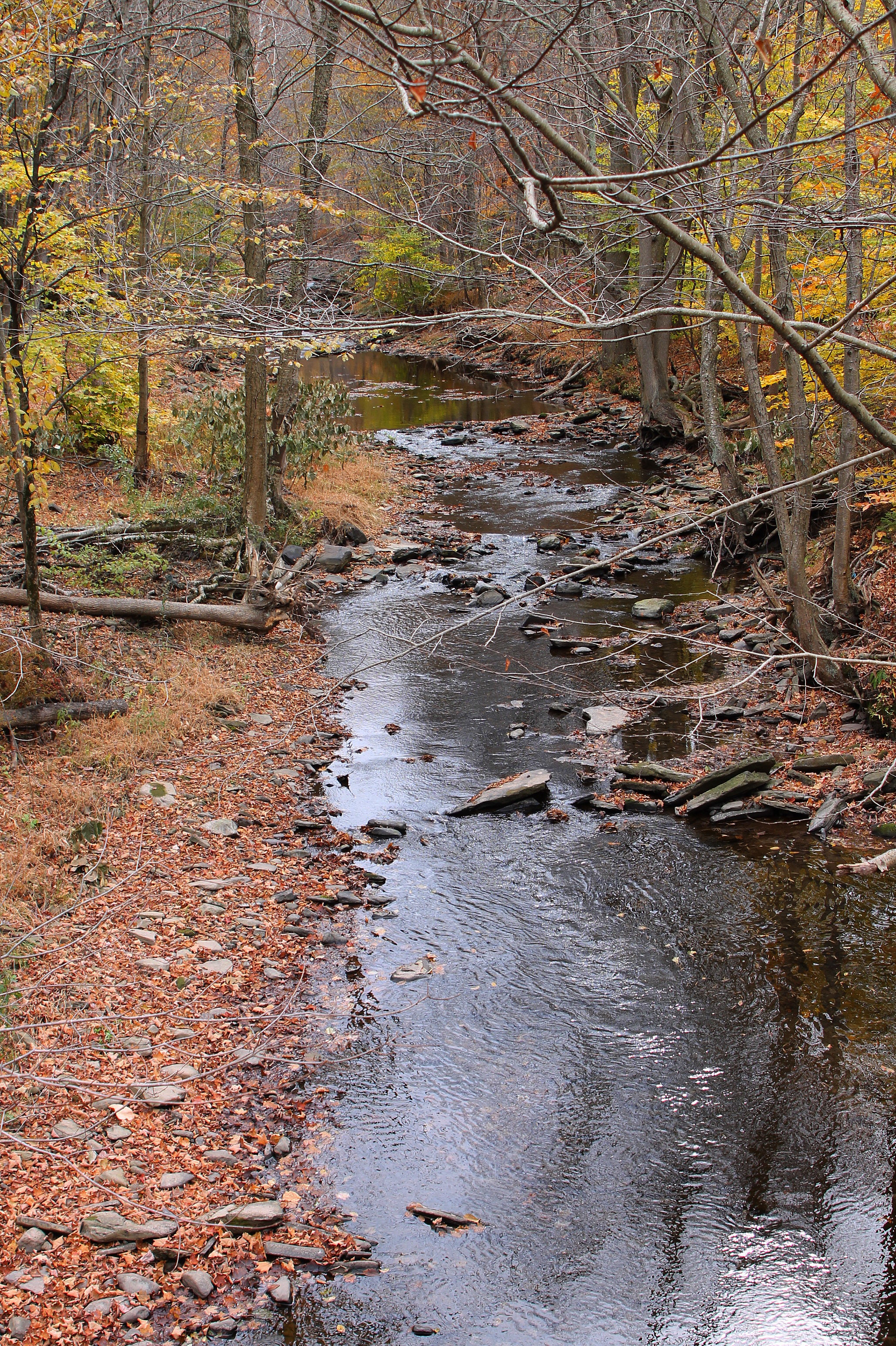
Leonard Creek looking upstream

Leonard Creek begins in Dallas Township, Luzerne County. It flows in an east-southeasterly direction for more than a mile, flowing through a valley and passing several ponds. The creek then turns east-northeast for several tenths of a mile, receiving two unnamed tributaries from the right. At this point, it turns north for roughly a mile, crossing Pennsylvania Route 309 and leaving Dallas Township and Luzerne County.

Upon exiting Luzerne County, Leonard Creek enters Monroe Township, Wyoming County. It flows north-northwest for a few miles alongside Pennsylvania Route 309, receiving two unnamed tributaries from the right and one unnamed tributary from the left. The creek then turns northwest for several tenths of a mile, receiving one unnamed tributary from the right and one from the left before turning north-northwest. At this point, its valley becomes considerably deeper and it receives an unnamed tributary from the right. After more than a mile, the creek leaves its valley and turns north, flowing alongside Bowman Creek. After several tenths of a mile, it turns northwest and reaches its confluence with Bowman Creek.

Leonard Creek joins Bowman Creek 10.00 miles (16.09 km) upstream of its mouth.

== Hydrology ==
Leonard Creek is not designated as an impaired waterbody.

== Geography and geology ==
The elevation near the mouth of Leonard Creek is 837 feet (255 m) above sea level. The elevation of the creek's source is between 1,200 and 1,220 feet (366 and 372 m) above sea level.

The surficial geology along a significant portion of the length of Leonard Creek consists of alluvium. In the lower reaches of the creek, this is bordered by alluvial terrace, Wisconsinan Till, Wisconsinan Ice-Contact Stratified Drift, bedrock consisting of sandstone and shale, and fill. Further upstream, all of these types of surficial geology are present. However, patches of alluvial fan and a sand and gravel pit are present.

== Watershed ==
The watershed of Leonard Creek has an area of 17.1 square miles (44 km^{2}). The creek passes through both the United States Geological Survey quadrangle of Noxen and the quadrangle of Center Moreland.

Leonard Creek is one of the major tributaries of Bowman Creek.

The main land use in the watershed of Leonard Creek is forested land. However, agricultural land comprises a significant minority of the land in the creek's watershed.

There are no drilled wells in the watershed of Leonard Creek. However, is a pipeline for natural gas in vicinity of the creek. Some residential and/or commercial land infringes upon the 100-year floodplain of it and its tributaries. The village of Kunkle is situated along the creek.

Flooding once caused significant damage to two bridges and channel improvements on Leonard Creek in Dallas Township, Luzerne County. However, the Federal Emergency Management Agency granted funds to rebuild one bridge and some channel walls.

== History ==
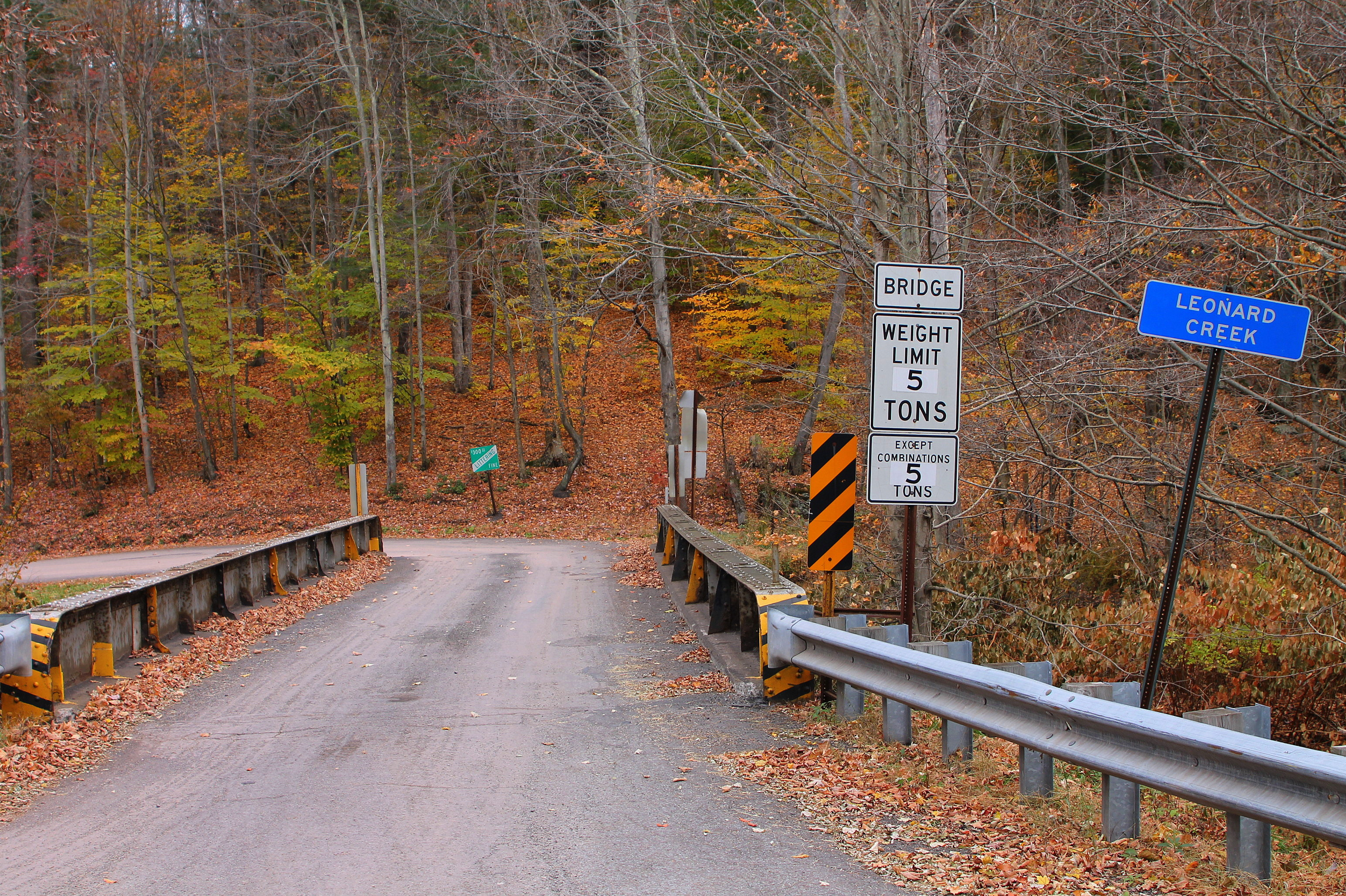
Bridge over Leonard Creek

Leonard Creek was entered into the Geographic Names Information System on August 2, 1979. Its identifier in the Geographic Names Information System is 1199032. The creek is also known as Leonards Creek or Leonard's Creek.

Historically, there were a number of mills on Leonard Creek. Levi Hoyt constructed a sawmill on the creek approximately 0.5 miles (0.80 km) downstream of Kunkle in around 1840.

A steel girder and floorbeam system bridge carrying T-337 over Leonard Creek was built in 1914 0.5 miles (0.80 km) west of Beaumont and is 65.9 feet (20.1 m) long. A prestressed box beam or girders bridge carrying State Route 2018 over the creek was built in 1934 and was repaired in 2007. This bridge is 44.0 feet (13.4 m) long and is situated in Monroe Township, Wyoming County. In 1940, a concrete tee beam bridge carrying Pennsylvania Route 309 over Leonard Creek was built in Dallas Township, Luzerne County. It is 32.2 feet (9.8 m) long. A concrete tee beam bridge carrying State Route 2026/Kunkle Road was built across the creek in the same year in Dallas Township and is 37.1 feet (11.3 m) long. A two-span concrete culvert bridge carrying State Route 2002 was constructed across the creek in Monroe Township, Wyoming County in 1969 and is 50.9 feet (15.5 m) long. A two-span concrete culvert bridge carrying T318/Falls Hill Road over Leonard Creek was built 1.2 miles (1.9 km) southeast of Beaumont in 2009 and is 29.9 feet (9.1 m) long.

The channel of Leonard Creek experienced significant damage during flooding on January 25, 2010. However, the Wyoming County Conservation District received a $125,000 grant from the Pennsylvania Department of Environmental Protection to repair it and four other stream channels in the area. In 2012, a study was carried out on the creek and 17 others to determine the effects of gas drilling on macroinvertebrates in the streams.

== Biology ==
The drainage basin of Leonard Creek is designated as a High-Quality Coldwater Fishery and a Migratory Fishery. Wild trout naturally reproduce in the creek from its upper reaches downstream to its mouth. An unnamed tributary of it in the vicinity of Beaumont is classified by the Pennsylvania Fish and Boat Commission as Class A Wild Trout Waters for brook trout and brown trout from its headwaters downstream to its mouth.

In 2014, Leonard Creek was stocked with rainbow trout by the Pennsylvania Fish and Boat Commission from the Luzerne County/Wyoming County line downstream to its mouth. The creek was stocked with brook trout as early as the 1930s. Great blue herons and salamanders have also been observed in the vicinity of the creek.

In the summer of 2012, a total of 184 macroinvertebrates from 17 genera and one other family were observed in Leonard Creek. These included five mayfly genera, three stonefly genera, two beetle genera, two caddisfly genera, two cranefly genera, the dragonfly genus Stylogomphus, the riffle beetle genus Dubiraphia, and the scud genus Hyalella.

In the summer of 2012, the EPT (Ephemeroptera, Plecoptera, and Trichoptera) taxa richness was 10 and the Becks Index value was 9. The Hilsenhoff Biotic Index value was 3.582 and the Shannon Wiener Index value was 2.104.

== See also ==
- Roaring Run (Bowman Creek), next tributary of Bowman Creek going downstream
- South Run (Bowman Creek), next tributary of Bowman Creek going upstream
- List of rivers of Pennsylvania
- List of tributaries of Bowman Creek
