= Stone Run (Bowman Creek tributary) =

River in Pennsylvania, United States

Stone Run Slife Run
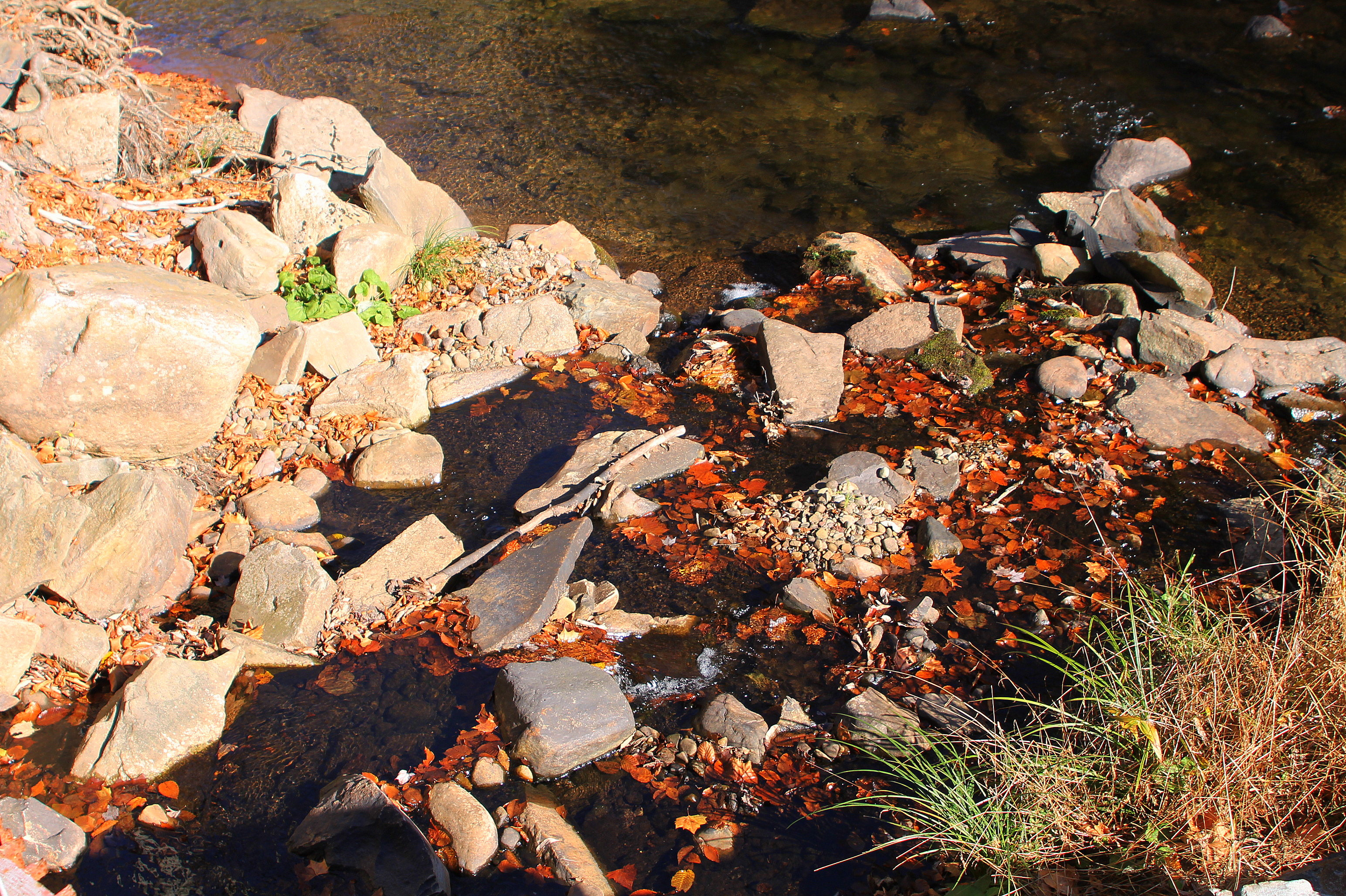
- Mouth of Stone Run at State Route 3002

Physical characteristics
- Source
  - location: plateau in Noxen Township, Wyoming County, Pennsylvania
  - elevation: between 2,200 and 2,220 feet (671 and 677 m)
- Mouth
  - location: Bowman Creek in Noxen Township, Wyoming County, Pennsylvania
  - coordinates: 41°25′07″N 76°05′18″W
  - elevation: 1,109 ft (338 m)
- Length: 2.2 mi (3.5 km)
- Basin size: 2.43 mi^{2} (6.3 km^{2})

Basin features
- Progression: Bowman Creek → Susquehanna River → Chesapeake Bay

Stone Run (also known as Slife Run) is a tributary of Bowman Creek in Wyoming County, Pennsylvania, in the United States. It is approximately 2.2 miles (3.5 km) long and flows through Noxen Township. The watershed of the stream has an area of 2.43 square miles (6.3 km^{2}). The stream is not designated as an impaired waterbody. The surficial geology in its vicinity consists of alluvium, Wisconsinan Ice-Contact Stratified Drift, Wisconsinan Till, and Wisconsinan Bouldery Till. The stream is classified as Class A Wild Trout Waters and its watershed is designated as a High-Quality Coldwater Fishery and a Migratory Fishery.

== Course ==
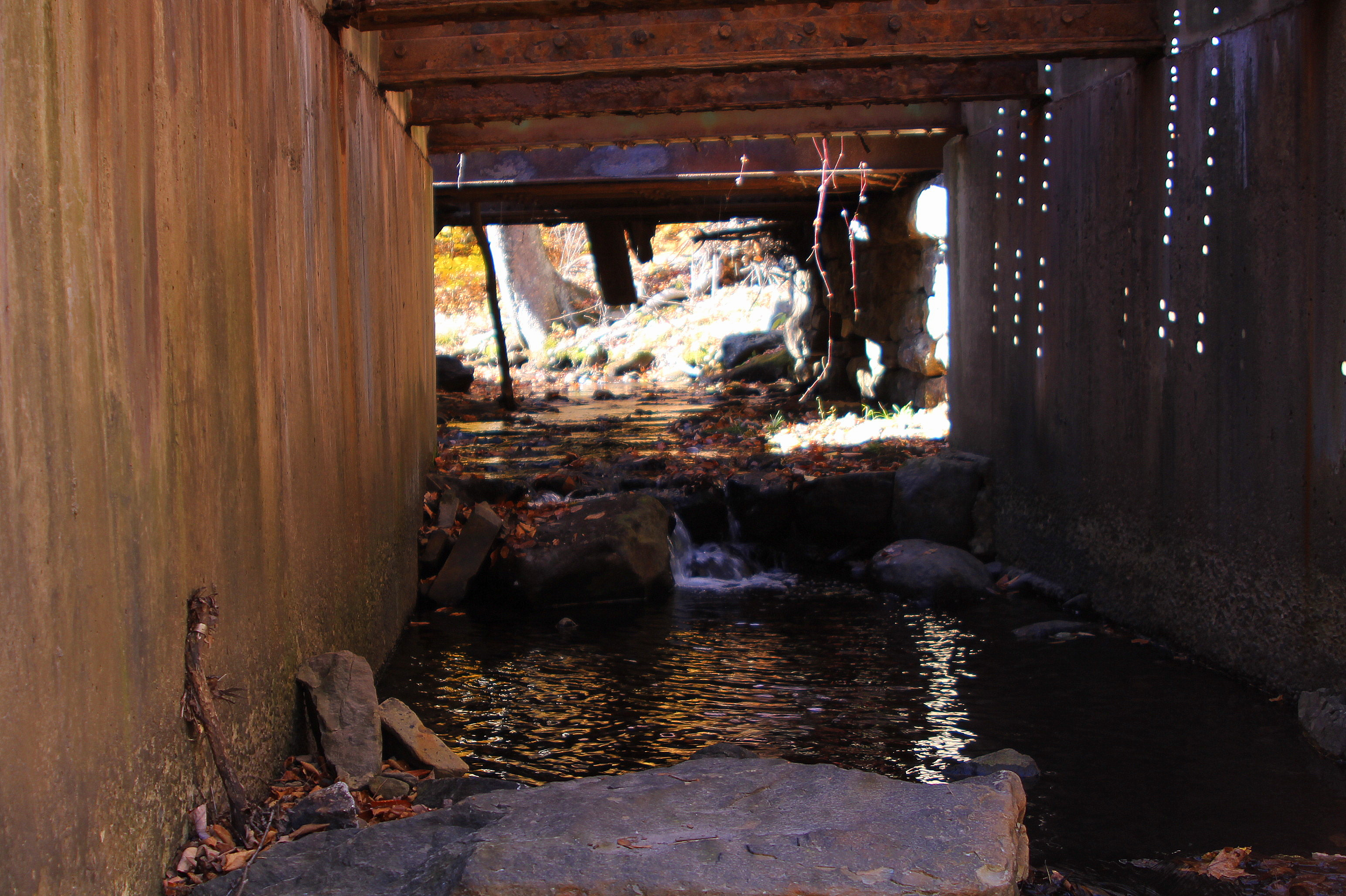
Stone Run looking upstream as it flows under a bridge.

Stone Run begins on a plateau in Noxen Township. It flows south-southeast for several tenths of a mile and enters a valley to the north of Stone Mountain before turning east-northeast. After several tenths of a mile, the stream turns southeast before turning east-northeast for a few tenths of a mile and then turning east-southeast. After several tenths of a mile, it turns east-northeast for several hundred feet and reaches its confluence with Bowman Creek.

Stone Run joins Bowman Creek 15.56 miles (25.04 km) upstream of its mouth.

== Hydrology ==
Stone Run is not designated as an impaired waterbody. The concentration of alkalinity in the stream is 9 milligrams per liter (0.0090 oz/cu ft).

== Geography and geology ==
The elevation near the mouth of Stone Run is 1,109 feet (338 m) above sea level. The elevation of the stream's source is between 2,200 and 2,220 feet (671 and 677 m) above sea level.

The surficial geology along the lower reaches of Stone Run mainly consists of alluvium, while Wisconsinan Ice-Contact Stratified Drift occurs in the vicinity. However, further upstream, the surficial geology consists of Wisconsinan Till and Wisconsinan Bouldery Till.

== Watershed ==
The watershed of Stone Run has an area of 2.43 square miles (6.3 km^{2}). The stream is entirely within the United States Geological Survey quadrangle of Noxen.

A total of 77 percent of the length of Stone Run is on public land that is open to access. The remaining 23 percent is on private land that is closed to access.

== History ==
Stone Run was entered into the Geographic Names Information System on August 2, 1979. Its identifier in the Geographic Names Information System is 1199626. The stream is also known as Slife Run. This variant name appears on a 1946 United States Geological Survey map.

In the 2000s, a wind farm in Wyoming County was proposed by BP Alternative Energy, but concerns about runoff from the wind farm were expressed. Stone Run was one of several streams in the project area.

== Biology ==
The drainage basin of Stone Run is designated as a High-Quality Coldwater Fishery and a Migratory Fishery. Wild trout naturally reproduce in the stream from its headwaters downstream to its mouth. It is classified by the Pennsylvania Fish and Boat Commission as Class A Wild Trout Waters for brook trout from its headwaters downstream to its mouth.

In the 1930s, Stone Run was stocked with fingerling brook trout.

== See also ==
- York Run, next tributary of Bowman Creek going downstream
- Sorber Run, next tributary of Bowman Creek going upstream
- List of rivers of Pennsylvania
- List of tributaries of Bowman Creek
