= Benson Hollow =

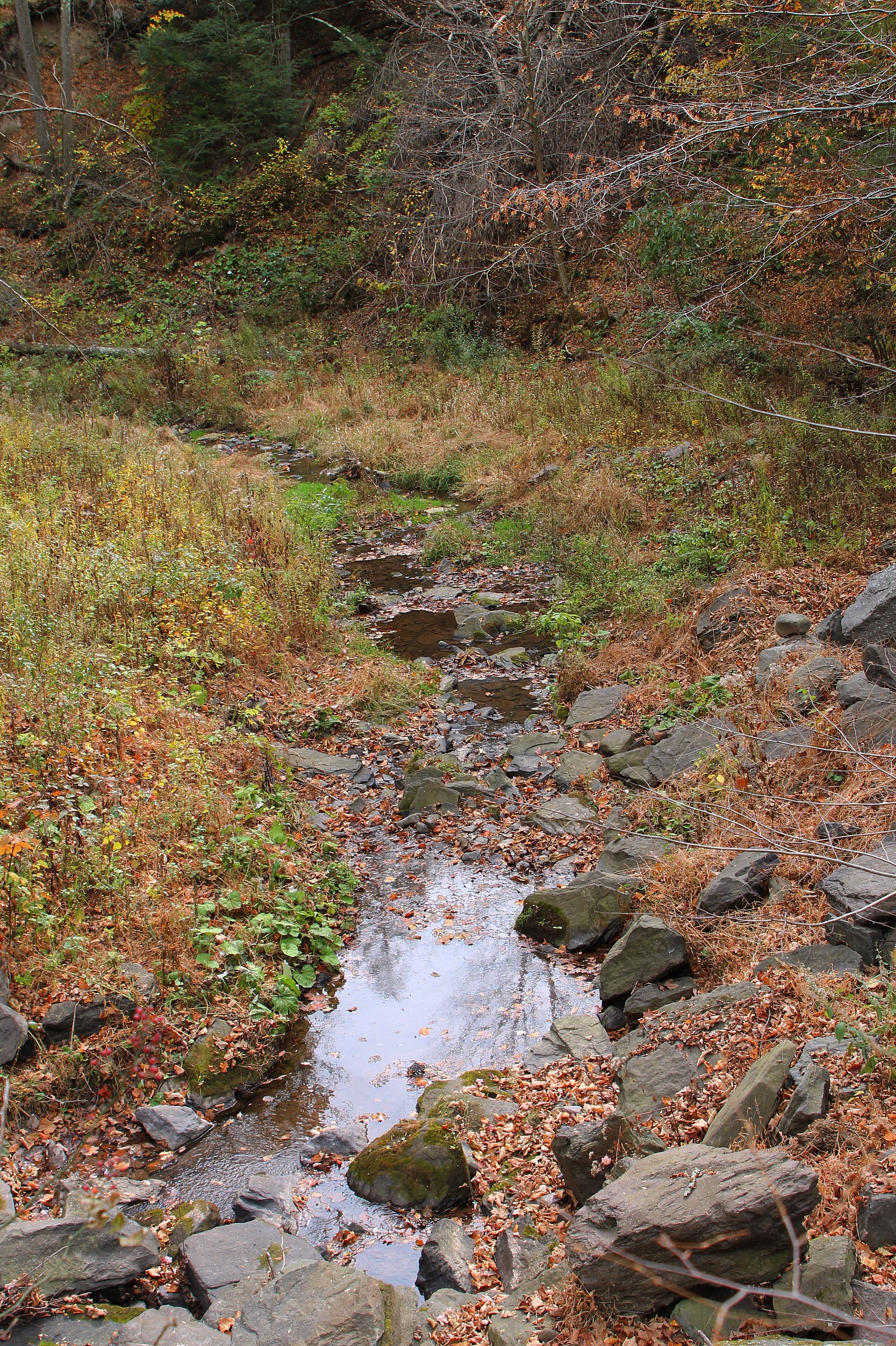
- Benson Hollow looking downstream

Physical characteristics
- Source
  - location: valley to the west of Cedar Ledge in Eaton Township, Wyoming County, Pennsylvania
  - elevation: between 1,340 and 1,360 feet (408 and 415 m)
- Mouth
  - location: Bowman Creek in Eaton Township, Wyoming County, Pennsylvania
  - coordinates: 41°30′49″N 75°58′17″W
  - elevation: 584 ft (178 m)
- Length: 0.9 mi (1.4 km)
- Basin size: 1.82 mi^{2} (4.7 km^{2})

Basin features
- Progression: Bowman Creek → Susquehanna River → Chesapeake Bay

Benson Hollow is a tributary of Bowman Creek in Wyoming County, Pennsylvania, in the United States. It is approximately 0.9 miles (1.4 km) long and flows through Eaton Township. The watershed of the stream has an area of 1.82 square miles (4.7 km^{2}). Benson Hollow is a first-order stream and is not designated as an impaired waterbody. The surficial geology in its vicinity consists of Wisconsinan Outwash, alluvium, Wisconsinan Till, bedrock, and a lake. The stream's watershed is designated as a High-Quality Coldwater Fishery and a Migratory Fishery.

== Course ==
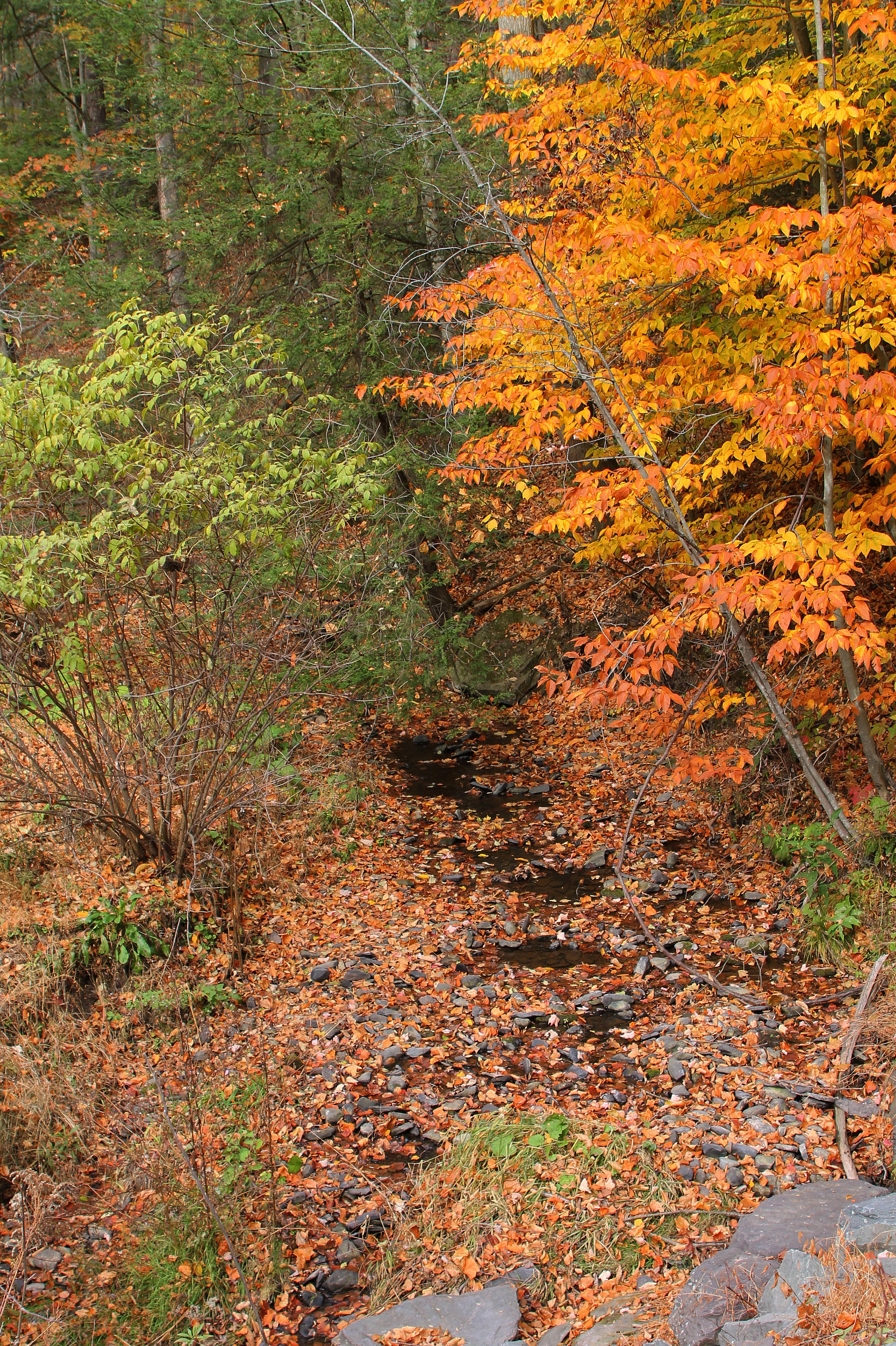
Benson Hollow looking upstream

Benson Hollow begins in a valley to the west of Cedar Ledge in Eaton Township. It flows south-southeast for a few tenths of a mile before turning east-southeast. Several tenths of a mile further downstream, the stream reaches its confluence with Bowman Creek.

Benson Hollow joins Bowman Creek 1.72 miles (2.77 km) upstream of its mouth.

== Hydrology ==
Benson Hollow is not designated as an impaired waterbody.

== Geography and geology ==
The elevation near the mouth of Benson Hollow is 584 feet (178 m) above sea level. The elevation of the stream's source is between 1,340 and 1,360 feet (408 and 415 m) above sea level.

During the Ice Age, glacial meltwater from Benson Hollow helped form a delta in the valley of Bowman Creek. There is a "deeply notched" col at the stream's headwaters.

Near the culvert, Benson Hollow has a streambed made of gravel with an average grain size of 45 millimeters (1.8 in). The stream is a Rosgen C Type stream and does not have large loads of debris. The surficial geology along the lower reaches of the stream, but alluvium and a lake occur in the upper reaches. The stream's valley is flanked by Wisconsinan Till and bedrock consisting of sandstone and shale.

== Watershed ==
The watershed of Benson Hollow has an area of 1.82 square miles (4.7 km^{2}). The stream is entirely in the United States Geological Survey quadrangle of Tunkhannock.

Benson Hollow is a first-order stream.

A single-barrel culvert carries Benson Hollow in one reach. The culvert passes a 25-year maximum design flow. Areas of deposition occur upstream of the culvert and a large scour pool occurs downstream of it. These phenomena are typical of such culverts.

== History ==
Benson Hollow does not have a name of its own, but takes its name from the valley through which it flows. The stream's valley was entered into the Geographic Names Information System on August 2, 1979. Its identifier in the Geographic Names Information System is 1169270.

== Biology ==
The drainage basin of Benson Hollow is designated as a High-Quality Coldwater Fishery and a Migratory Fishery. Wild trout naturally reproduce in the stream from its headwaters downstream to its mouth.

== See also ==
- Sugar Hollow Creek, next tributary of Bowman Creek going upstream
- List of rivers of Pennsylvania
- List of tributaries of Bowman Creek
