= Sugar Hollow Creek =

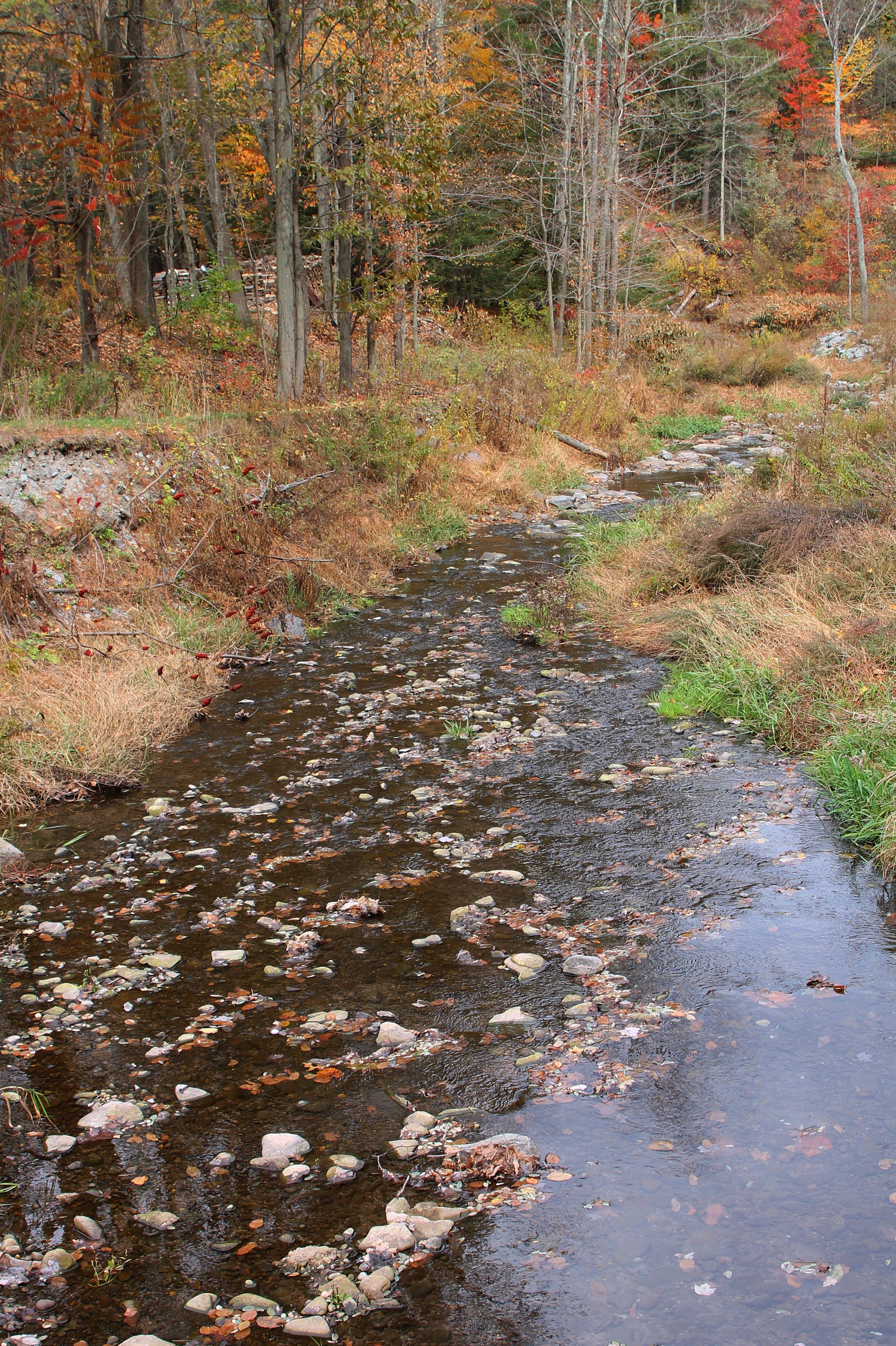
- Sugar Hollow Creek looking downstream from State Route 3003

Physical characteristics
- Source
  - location: between Doll Mountain and Forkston Mountain in Mehoopany Township, Pennsylvania
  - elevation: between 1,380 and 1,400 feet (421 and 427 m)
- Mouth
  - location: Bowman Creek in Eaton Township, Wyoming County, Pennsylvania
  - coordinates: 41°30′25″N 75°59′07″W
  - elevation: 636 ft (194 m)
- Length: 4.7 mi (7.6 km)
- Basin size: 7.07 sq mi (18.3 km^{2})

Basin features
- Progression: Bowman Creek → Susquehanna River → Chesapeake Bay
- Tributaries
  - left: one unnamed tributary
  - right: one unnamed tributary

Sugar Hollow Creek is a tributary of Bowman Creek in Wyoming County, Pennsylvania, in the United States. It is approximately 4.7 miles (7.6 km) long and flows through Mehoopany Township and Eaton Township. The watershed of the creek has an area of 7.07 square miles (18.3 km^{2}). The creek is not designated as an impaired waterbody. The surficial geology near its mouth consists of alluvium, Wisconsinan Outwash, and Wisconsinan Till. The creek is a High-Quality Coldwater Fishery, a Migratory Fishery, and Class A Wild Trout Waters.

== Course ==
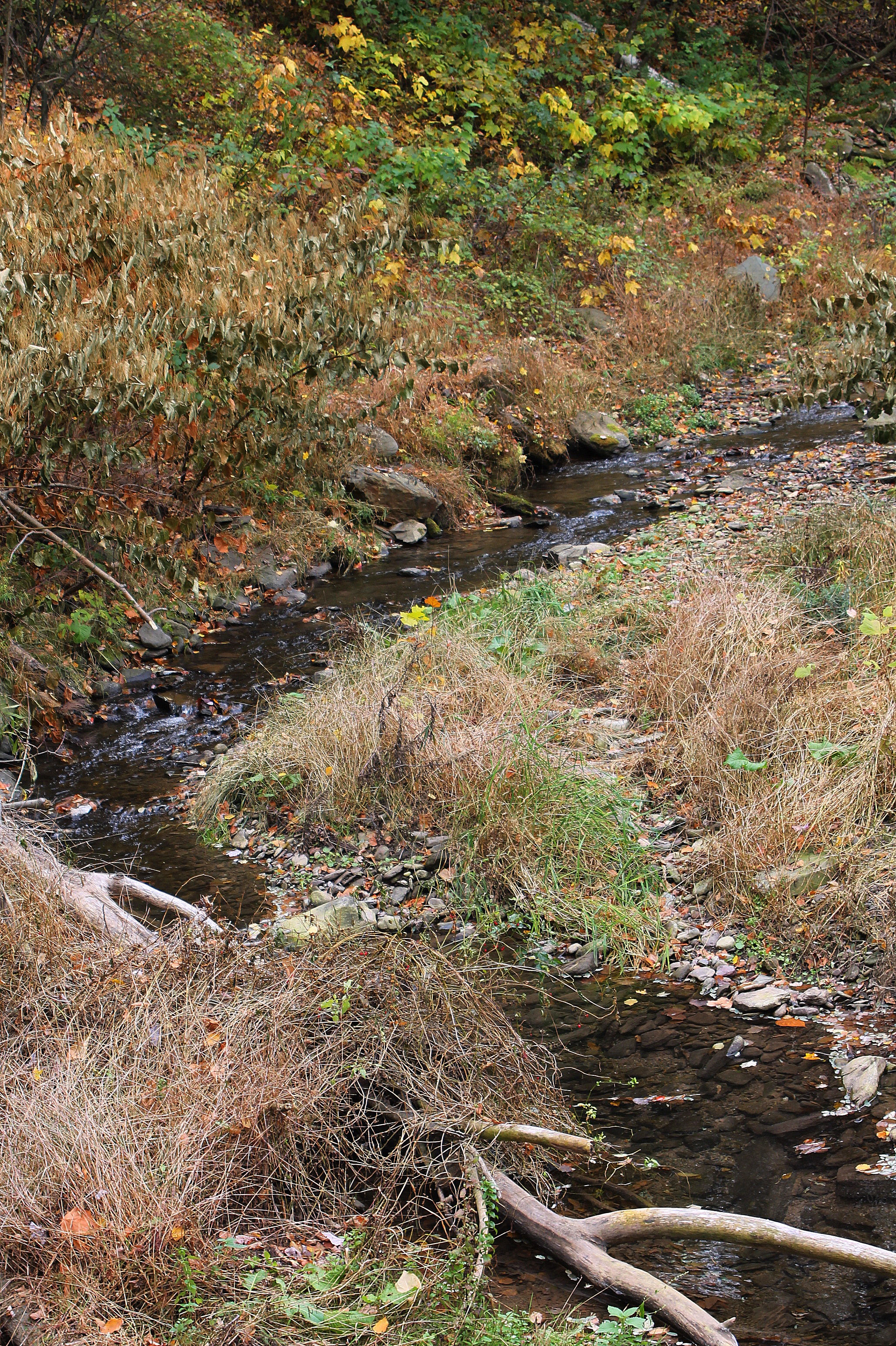
Sugar Hollow Creek looking upstream from State Route 3003

Sugar Hollow Creek begins between Doll Mountain and Forkston Mountain in Mehoopany Township. It flows east-northeast for a short distance before turning east-southeast and entering Eaton Township. After a few tenths of a mile, the creek turns east-northeast again before turning southeast. After several tenths of a mile, it receives an unnamed tributary from the right and as its valley narrows, it heads in an easterly direction for several tenths of a mile before receiving an unnamed tributary from the left. The creek then flows east-southeast for more than a mile until it reaches its confluence with Bowman Creek.

Sugar Hollow Creek joins Bowman Creek 2.62 miles (4.22 km) upstream of its mouth.

== Hydrology ==
Sugar Hollow Creek is not designated as an impaired waterbody. The concentration of alkalinity in Sugar Hollow Creek is 30 milligrams per liter (0.030 oz/cu ft).

== Geography and geology ==
The elevation near the mouth of Sugar Hollow Creek is 636 feet (194 m) above sea level. The elevation of the creek's source is between 1,380 and 1,400 feet (421 and 427 m) above sea level. Sugar Hollow Creek flows through a valley known as Sugar Hollow.

Near the mouth of Sugar Hollow Creek, the surficial geology mainly consists of Wisconsinan Outwash, but there is a thin strip of alluvium along the creek itself. Slightly further upstream, some Wisconsinan Till is present.

During the Ice Age, glacial meltwater from the valley of Sugar Hollow Creek helped to create a large delta in the valley of Bowman Creek. This delta has since been divided by stream action. There are two "deeply notched" cols at the headwaters of the creek. There is an abandoned and semi-reclaimed pit at the mouth of the creek's valley.

== Watershed ==
The watershed of Sugar Hollow Creek has an area of 7.07 square miles (18.3 km^{2}). The mouth of the creek is in the United States Geological Survey quadrangle of Tunkhannock. However, its source is in the quadrangle of Meshoppen.

Sugar Hollow Creek is one of several major tributaries to Bowman Creek.

The entire length of Sugar Hollow Creek is on private land. A total of 80 percent is open to access, while the remaining 20 percent is closed to access.

== History ==
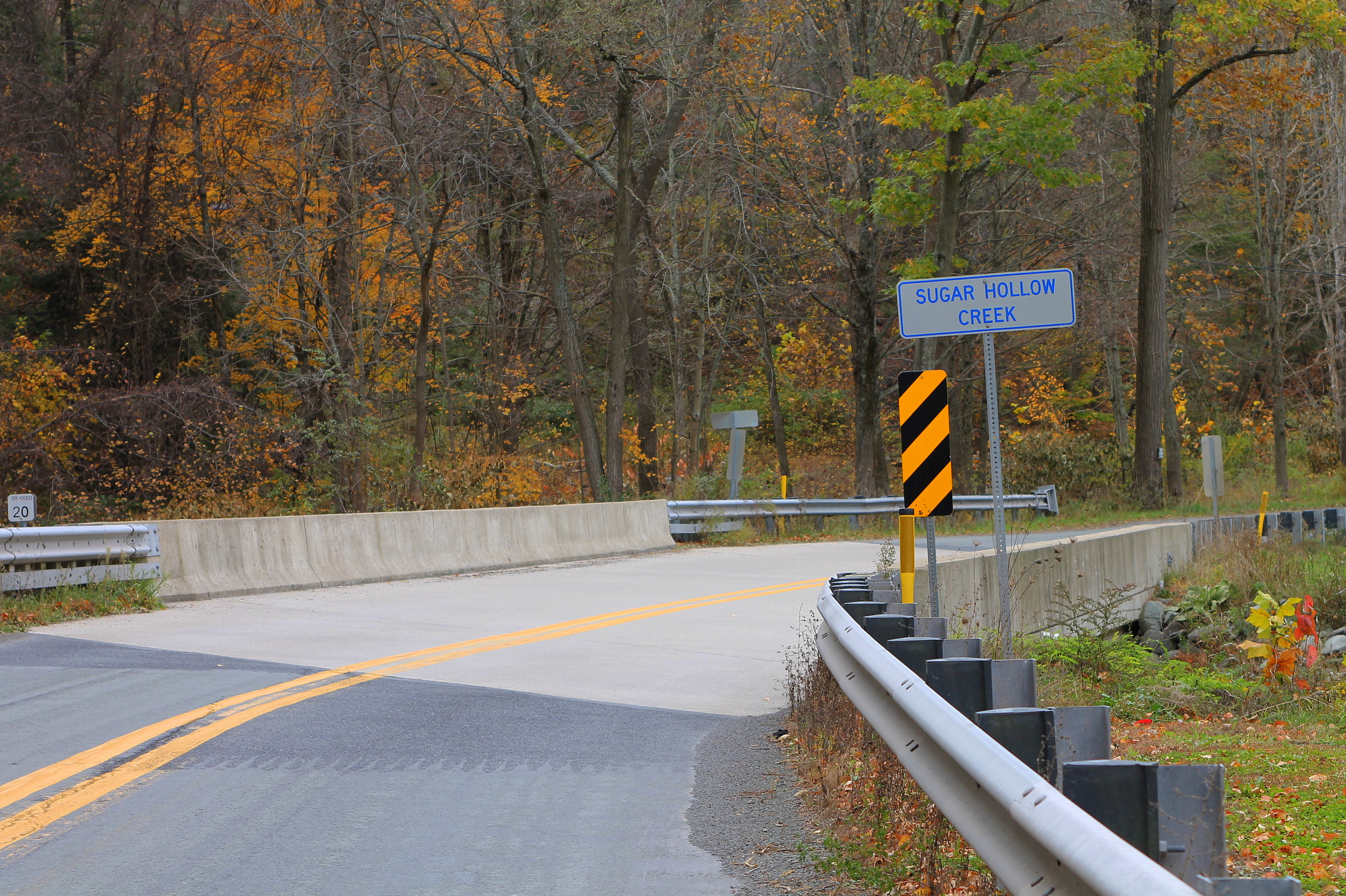
Bridge carrying State Route 3003 over Sugar Hollow Creek

Sugar Hollow Creek was entered into the Geographic Names Information System on August 2, 1979. Its identifier in the Geographic Names Information System is 1193493.

In the 19th century, a gristmill was supplied with water from Sugar Hollow Creek by means of a long, wooden conduit.

A concrete stringer/multi-beam or girder bridge carrying State Route 3003 over Sugar Hollow Creek was constructed in Eaton Township in 1928 and is 29.9 feet (9.1 m) long. A prestressed box beam or girders bridge carrying State Route 3003 over the creek was built in Eaton Township in 1990 and is 42.0 feet (12.8 m) long. Another bridge of the same type and carrying the same road was constructed across the creek in 2007 and is 76.1 feet (23.2 m) long.

In 2006, the Northern Tier Regional Planning and Development Commission was given a $200,000 federal grant to remove woody debris from along Sugar Hollow Creek.

== Biology ==
Wild trout naturally reproduce in Sugar Hollow Creek from its headwaters downstream to its mouth. The creek's drainage basin is designated as a High-Quality Coldwater Fishery and a Migratory Fishery. The entire length of the creek is designated by the Pennsylvania Fish and Boat Commission as Class A Wild Trout Waters for rainbow trout. The Pennsylvania Fish and Boat Commission does not stock with hatchery-raised trout in order to avoid disrupting the natural trout populations.

== See also ==
- Benson Hollow, next tributary of Bowman Creek going downstream
- Marsh Creek (Bowman Creek), next tributary of Bowman Creek going upstream
- List of rivers of Pennsylvania
- List of tributaries of Bowman Creek
