= South Run (Bowman Creek tributary) =

South Run South Run Creek
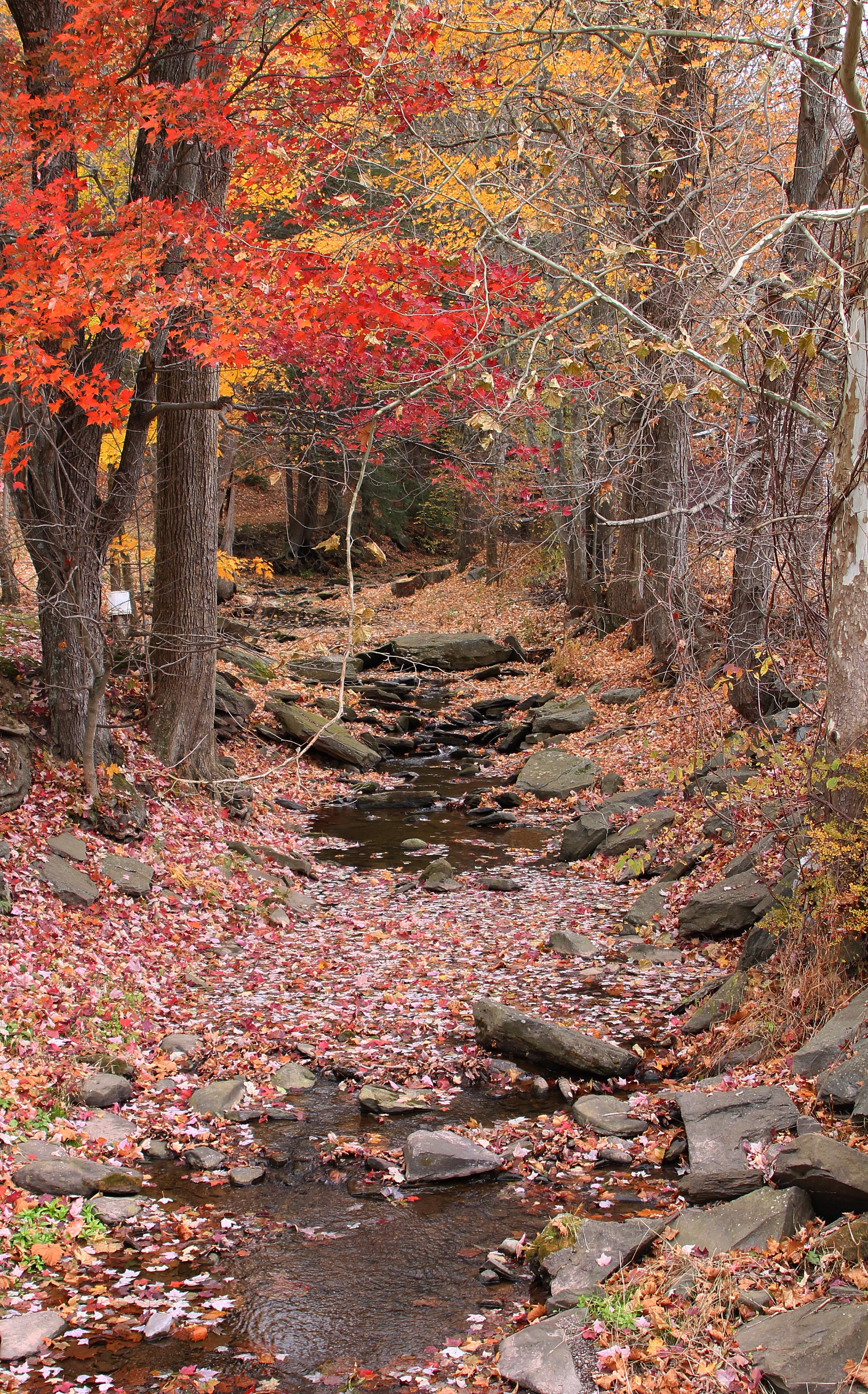
- South Run looking upstream from Buckwheat Hollow Road

Physical characteristics
- Source
  - location: broad valley near Hickory Knob in Monroe Township, Wyoming County, Pennsylvania
  - elevation: between 1,180 and 1,200 feet (360 and 366 m)
- Mouth
  - location: Bowman Creek in Monroe Township, Wyoming County, Pennsylvania
  - coordinates: 41°25′16″N 76°01′57″W
  - elevation: 899 ft (274 m)
- Length: 2.5 mi (4.0 km)
- Basin size: 3.42 mi^{2} (8.9 km^{2})

Basin features
- Progression: Bowman Creek → Susquehanna River → Chesapeake Bay

South Run (also known as South Run Creek) is a tributary of Bowman Creek in Wyoming County, Pennsylvania, in the United States. It is approximately 2.5 miles (4.0 km) long and flows through Monroe Township. The watershed of the stream has an area of 3.42 square miles (8.9 km^{2}). It is not designated as an impaired waterbody. The surficial geology in the vicinity of the stream consists of alluvium, alluvial terrace, and Wisconsinan Till. Its watershed is designated as a High-Quality Coldwater Fishery and a Migratory Fishery.

== Course ==
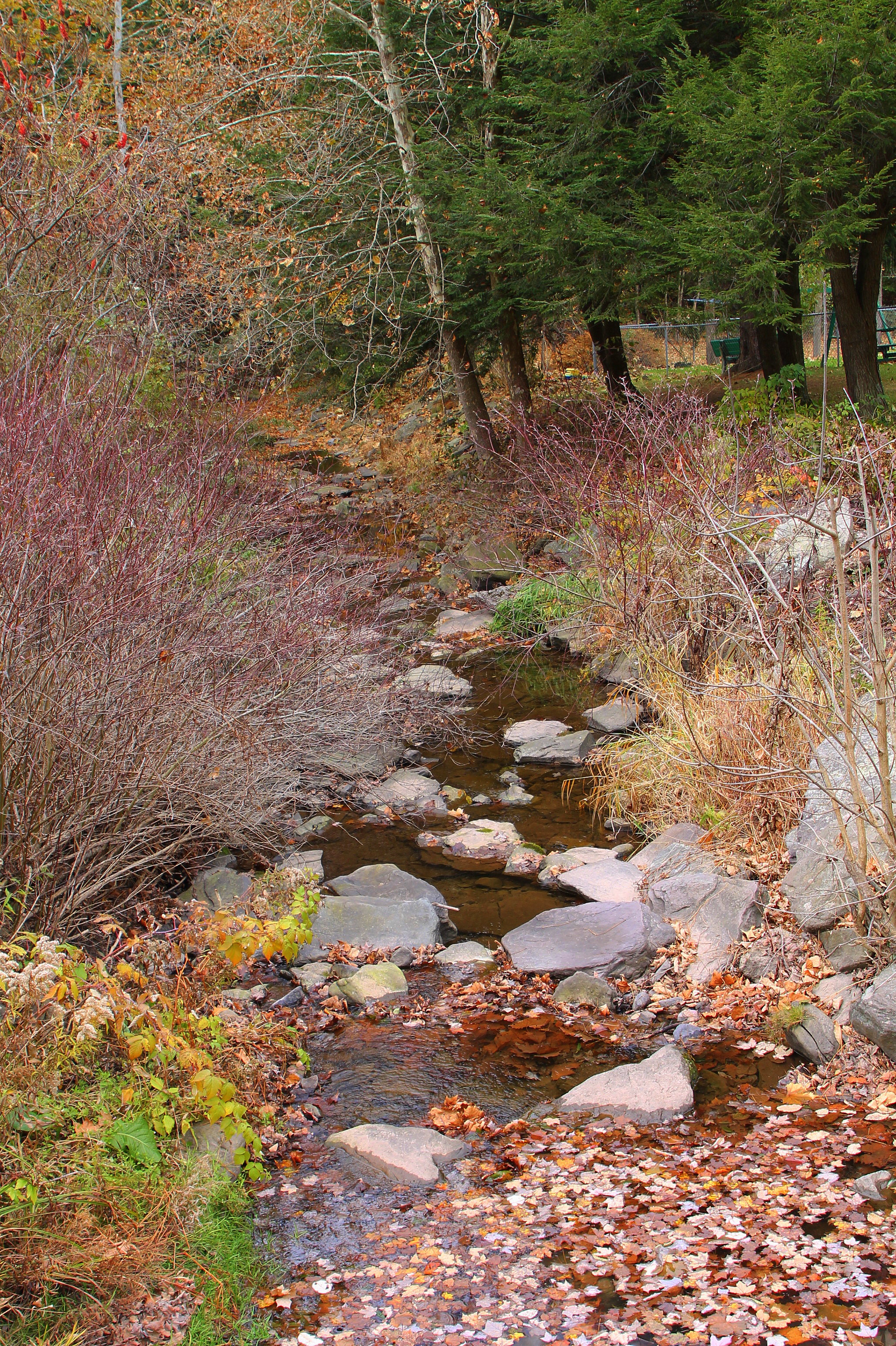
South Run looking downstream from Buckwheat Hollow Road

South Run begins in a broad valley near Hickory Knob in Monroe Township. It flows in a northerly direction for several tenths of a mile before turning northwest as its valley narrows. After several tenths of a mile, the stream turns north for several tenths of a mile before turning northwest and then north again. It then reaches its confluence with Bowman Creek.

South Run joins Bowman Creek 11.68 miles (18.80 km) upstream of its mouth.

== Hydrology ==
South Run is not designated as an impaired waterbody.

== Geography and geology ==
The elevation near the mouth of South Run is 899 feet (274 m) above sea level. The elevation of the stream's source is between 1,180 and 1,200 feet (360 and 366 m) above sea level.

The surficial geology of the land adjacent to South Run mainly consists of alluvium. However, large areas of a till known as Wisconsinan Till also occur in the stream's watershed. A patch of alluvial terrace occurs near its mouth.

There is a spring in the watershed of South Run. The spring's source is "somewhat diffuse" and it is located at the headwaters of a rill that flows into South Run.

== Watershed ==
The watershed of South Run has an area of 3.42 square miles (8.9 km^{2}). The stream is entirely within the United States Geological Survey quadrangle of Noxen.

Some farmstead land infringes upon the 100-year floodplain of South Run in Monroe Township.

== History ==
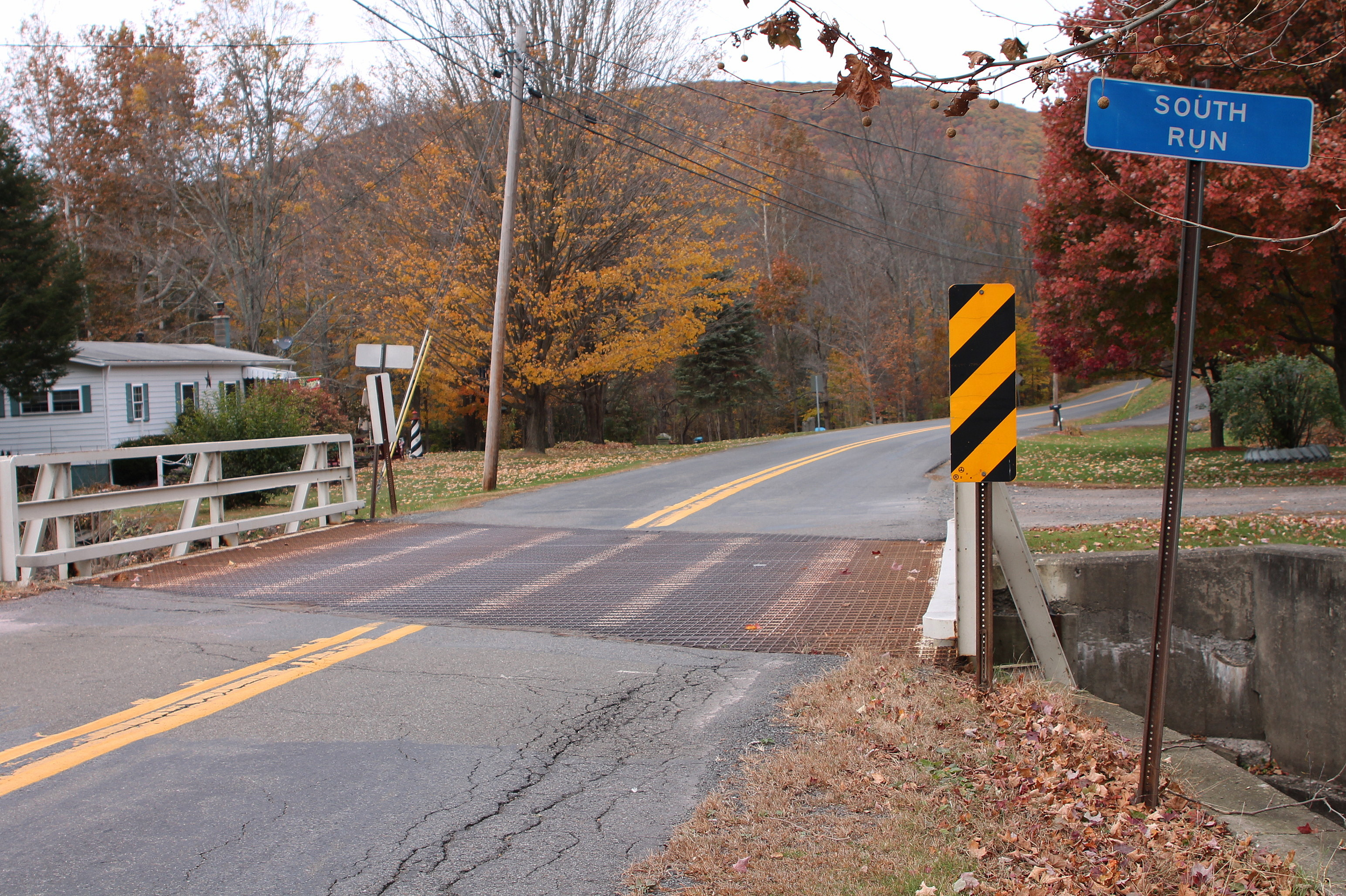
Bridge carrying Buckwheat Hollow Road/State Route 2001 over South Run

South Run was entered into the Geographic Names Information System on August 2, 1979. Its identifier in the Geographic Names Information System is 1199570. The stream is also known as South Run Creek.

A concrete tee beam bridge carrying State Route 2001 was constructed over South Run in 1941 in Monroe Township and is 29.9 feet (9.1 m) long. A steel stringer/multi-beam or girder bridge carrying the same road over the stream in Monroe Township was built in that year and is 26.9 feet (8.2 m) long. In 1954, a third bridge carrying State Route 2001 was built Monroe Township. This bridge is a concrete slab bridge with a length of 24.0 feet (7.3 m). One bridge over the creek is eligible for replacement, as of 2014.

== Biology ==
The watershed of South Run is designated as a High-Quality Coldwater Fishery and a Migratory Fishery. Wild trout naturally reproduce in the stream from its headwaters downstream to its mouth.

== See also ==
- Leonard Creek, next tributary of Bowman Creek going downstream
- Beaver Run (Bowman Creek), next tributary of Bowman Creek going upstream
- List of rivers of Pennsylvania
- List of tributaries of Bowman Creek
