= Noxen, Pennsylvania =

Coordinates: 41°25′45″N 76°03′46″W

- census-designated place
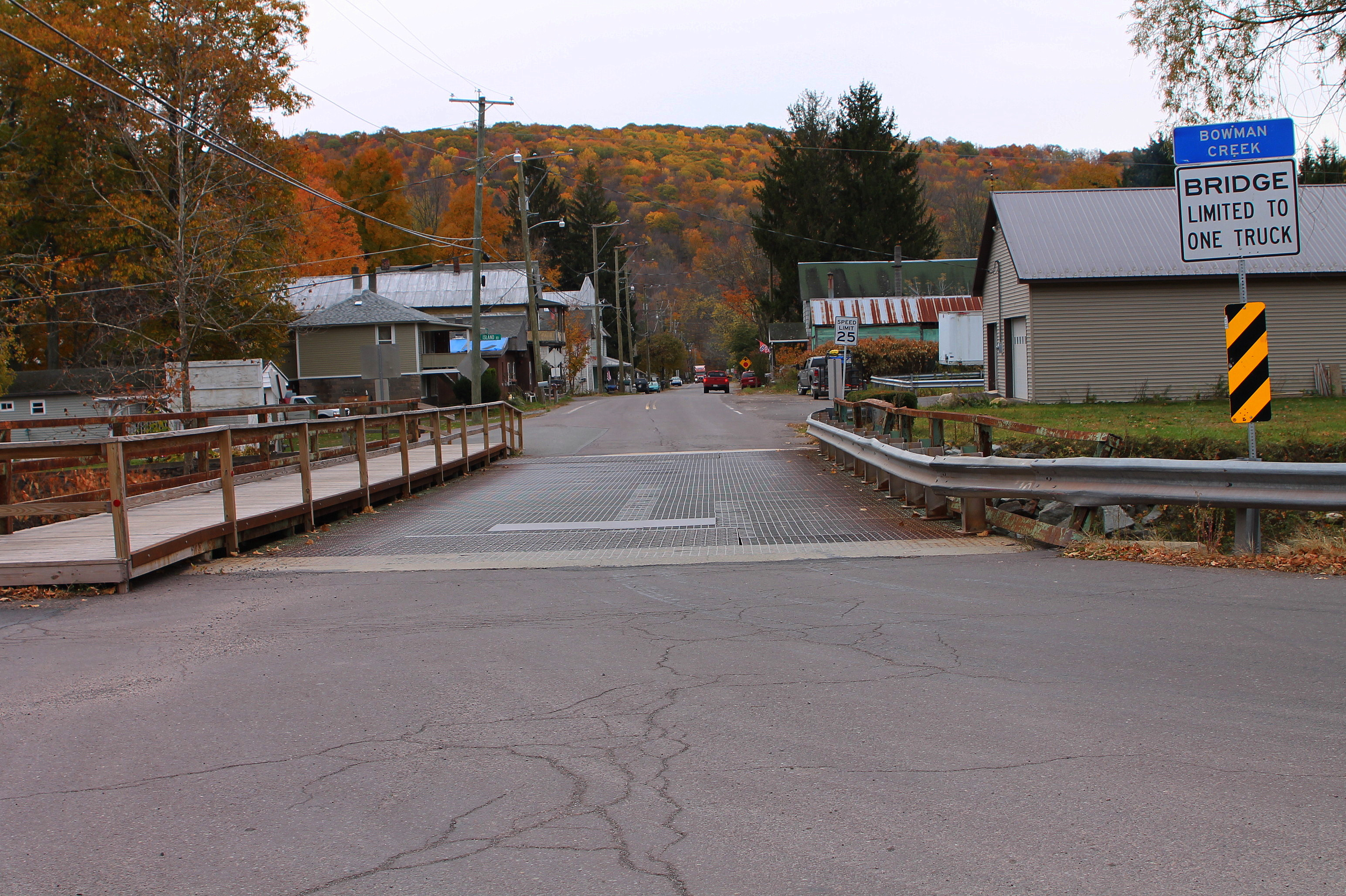
- Main street in Noxen
- Interactive map of Noxen, Pennsylvania
- Country: United States
- State: Pennsylvania
- County: Wyoming

Area
  - Total: 1.99 sq mi (5.16 km^{2})
  - Land: 1.98 sq mi (5.13 km^{2})
  - Water: 0.012 sq mi (0.03 km^{2})

Population (2020)
  - Total: 643
  - Density: 324.5/sq mi (125.28/km^{2})
- Time zone: UTC-5 (Eastern (EST))
  - Summer (DST): UTC-4 (EDT)
- ZIP code: 18636
- Area codes: 272 and 570
- FIPS code: 42-55728
- Website: www.noxenpa.com

Noxen is a census-designated place that is located in Noxen Township, Wyoming County in the Commonwealth of Pennsylvania in the United States.

This community is situated close to Pennsylvania Route 29, approximately 10 miles (16 km) west of Scranton.

== Demographics ==
As of the 2010 census its population was 633 residents.

Historical population
Census	Pop.	Note	%±
2020	643		—
U.S. Decennial Census

== Gallery ==
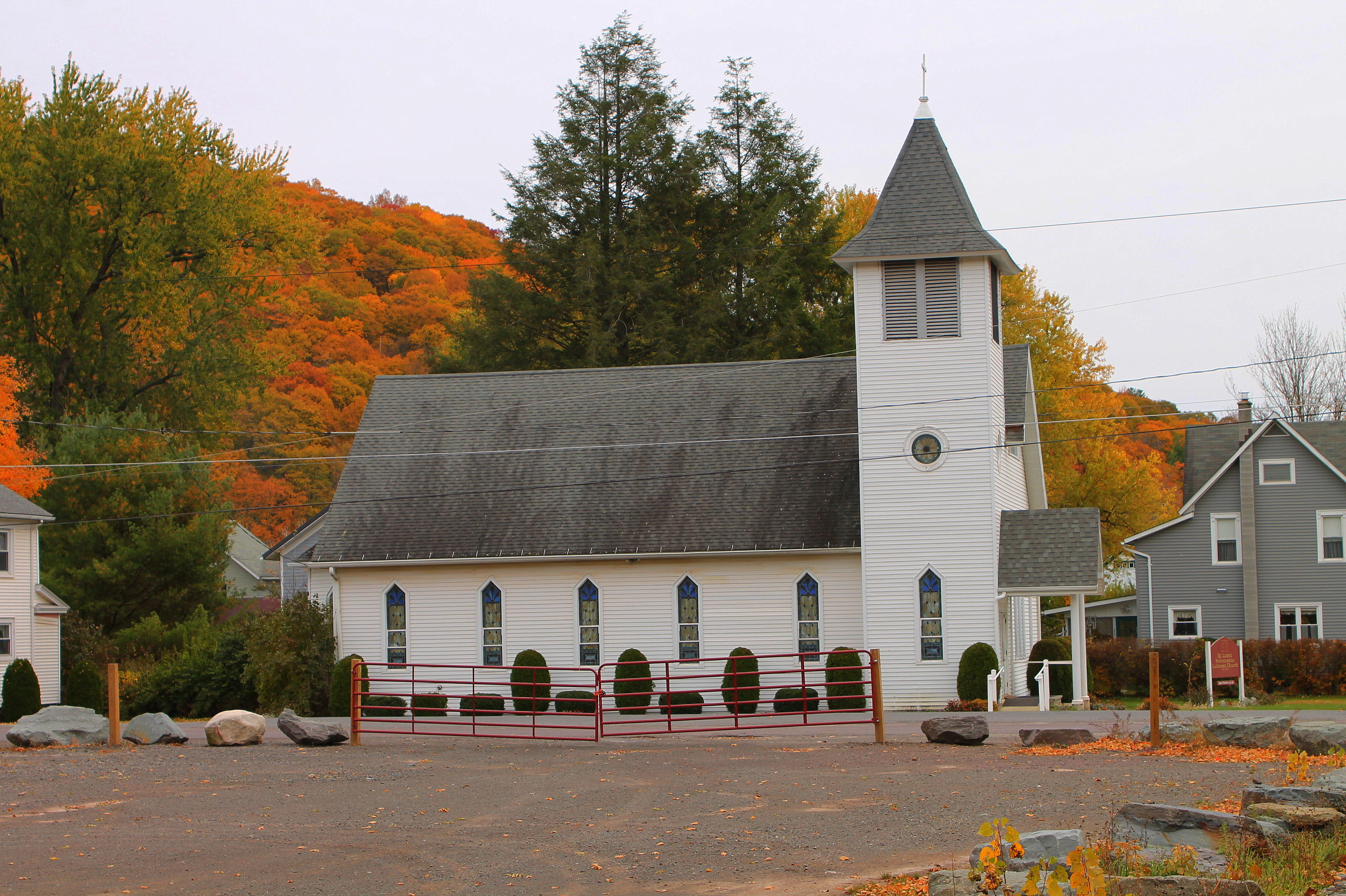
Church in Noxen

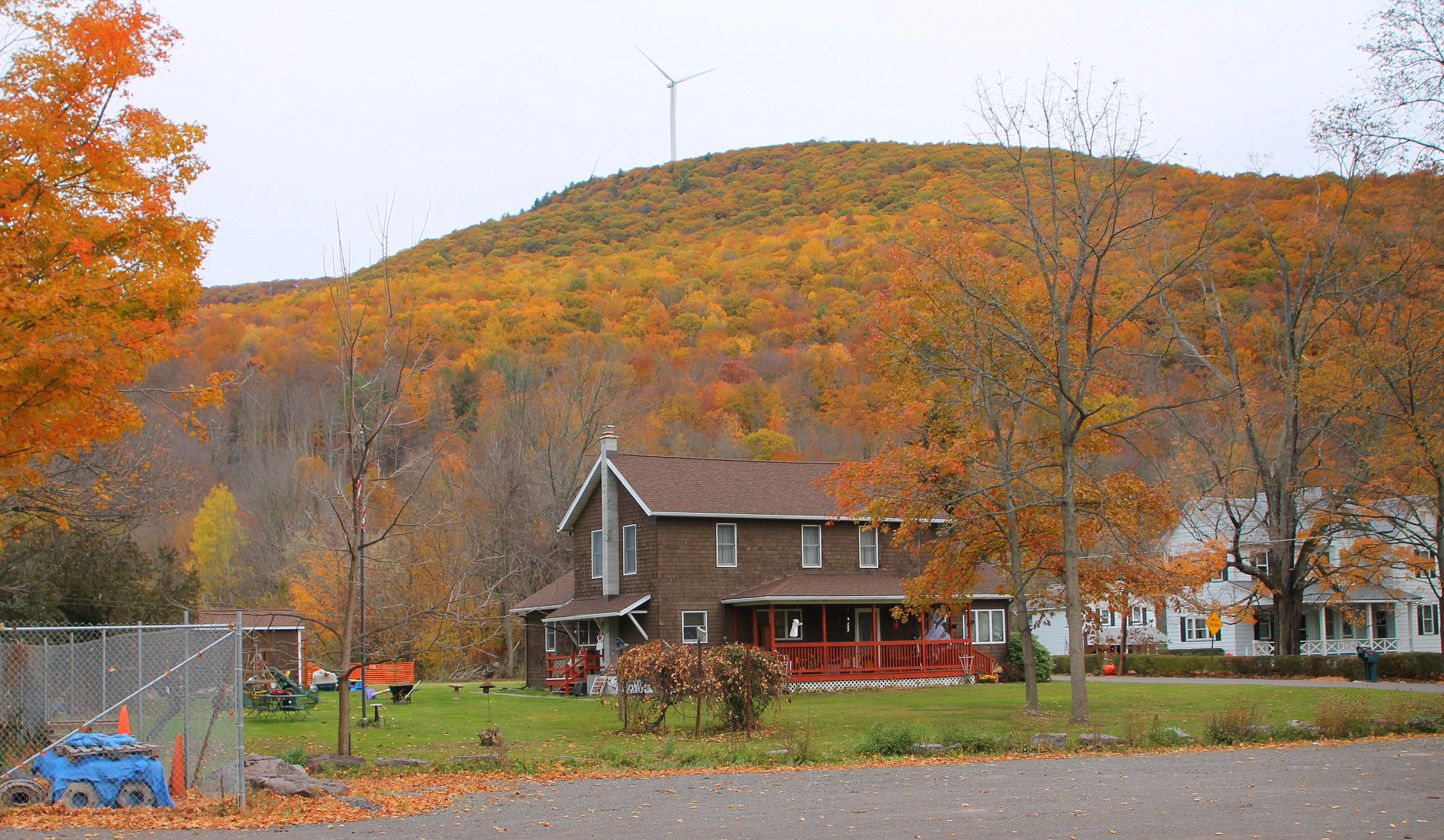
Schooley's Peak with wind turbine near Noxen
