= Windfall Run =

Physical characteristics
- Source
  - location: wetland on a plateau in Noxen Township, Wyoming County, Pennsylvania
  - elevation: between 2,200 and 2,220 feet (671 and 677 m)
- Mouth
  - location: Baker Run in Noxen Township, Wyoming County, Pennsylvania
  - coordinates: 41°24′16″N 76°07′20″W
  - elevation: 1,365 ft (416 m)
- Length: 1.6 mi (2.6 km)
- Basin size: 1.68 sq mi (4.4 km^{2})

Basin features
- Progression: Baker Run → Bowman Creek → Susquehanna River → Chesapeake Bay

Windfall Run is a tributary of Baker Run in Wyoming County, Pennsylvania, in the United States. It is approximately 1.6 miles (2.6 km) long and flows through Noxen Township. The watershed of the stream has an area of 1.68 square miles (4.4 km^{2}). The stream itself is classified as Class A Wild Trout Waters by the Pennsylvania Fish and Boat Commission. The surficial geology in its vicinity includes Wisconsinan Till and bedrock.

== Course ==
Windfall Run begins in a wetland on a plateau in Noxen Township. It flows north-northeast for several tenths of a mile and enters a deep valley before turning east-southeast. The stream flows in this direction for more than a mile before reaching its confluence with Baker Run.

Windfall Run joins Baker Run, which is itself only 1.1 miles (1.8 km) long, 0.66 miles (1.06 km) upstream of its mouth.

== Hydrology ==
The concentration of alkalinity in Windfall Run is 4 milligrams per liter (0.0040 oz/cu ft).

== Geography and geology ==
The elevation near the mouth of Windfall Run is 1,365 feet (416 m) above sea level. The elevation near the source of the stream is between 2,200 and 2,220 feet (671 and 677 m) above sea level.

The surficial geology along Windfall Run in the Dutch Mountain quadrangle, where most of the stream is situated, consists of a till known as Wisconsinan Till. However, bedrock consisting of sandstone and shale occurs on the sides of the stream's valley.

For much of its length, Noxen Township flows through a deep valley cut into a plateau.

== Watershed ==
The watershed of Windfall Run has an area of 1.68 square miles (4.4 km^{2}). The mouth of the stream is in the United States Geological Survey quadrangle of Noxen. However, its source is in the quadrangle of Dutch Mountain.

The entire length of Windfall Run is on public land that is open to access. The stream is situated entirely within Pennsylvania State Game Lands Number 57.

== History ==
Windfall Run was entered into the Geographic Names Information System on August 2, 1979. Its identifier in the Geographic Names Information System is 1199800.

== Biology ==
Wild trout naturally reproduce in Windfall Run from its headwaters downstream to its mouth. The stream is designated by the Pennsylvania Fish and Boat Commission as Class A Wild Trout Waters for brook trout from its headwaters downstream to its mouth.

== See also ==
- List of rivers of Pennsylvania
- List of tributaries of Bowman Creek
