= Broad Hollow Run =

Physical characteristics
- Source
  - location: deep valley in Noxen Township, Wyoming County, Pennsylvania
  - elevation: between 1,500 and 1,520 feet (457 and 463 m)
- Mouth
  - location: Bowman Creek near Stull in Noxen Township, Wyoming County, Pennsylvania
  - coordinates: 41°23′56″N 76°06′54″W
  - elevation: 1,234 ft (376 m)
- Length: 1.0 mi (1.6 km)
- Basin size: 1.04 mi^{2} (2.7 km^{2})

Basin features
- Progression: Bowman Creek → Susquehanna River → Chesapeake Bay

Broad Hollow Run is a tributary of Bowman Creek in Wyoming County, Pennsylvania, in the United States. It is approximately 1.0 mile (1.6 km) long and flows through Noxen Township. The watershed of the stream has an area of 1.04 square miles (2.7 km^{2}). The surficial geology in the vicinity of the stream consists of alluvium, alluvial fan, and Wisconsinan Till. Its watershed is designated as a High-Quality Coldwater Fishery and a Migratory Fishery.

== Course ==
Broad Hollow Run begins in a deep valley in Noxen Township. It flows north-northwest for several hundred feet before turning north-northeast and north for a few tenths of a mile. In this reach, the valley of the stream becomes much shallower on one side. The stream then turns north-northeast again. Several tenths of a mile further downstream, it enters the valley of Bowman Creek and reaches its confluence with Bowman Creek.

Broad Hollow Run joins Bowman Creek 17.70 miles (28.49 km) upstream of its mouth.

== Geography and geology ==
The elevation near the mouth of Broad Hollow Run is 1,234 feet (376 m) above sea level. The elevation near the source of Broad Hollow Run is between 1,500 and 1,520 feet (457 and 463 m) above sea level.

The surficial geology near the mouth of Broad Hollow Run consists of alluvium (which contains stratified sand, silt, gravel, and some boulders) and a till known as Wisconsinan Till. Further upstream, the surficial geology consists of Wisconsinan Till and alluvial fan, some of which is underlain by glacial lake clays. The surficial geology at the headwaters consists entirely of Wisconsinan Till.

Broad Hollow Run is in the vicinity of the North Mountain region.

== Hydrology and watershed ==
The watershed of Broad Hollow Run has an area of 1.04 square miles (2.7 km^{2}). The stream is entirely within the United States Geological Survey quadrangle of Noxen. Its mouth is located near Stull.

Broad Hollow Run attains the requirements for use by aquatic life.

== History ==
Broad Hollow Run was entered into the Geographic Names Information System on August 2, 1979. Its identifier in the Geographic Names Information System is 1198477.

== Biology ==
The drainage basin of Broad Hollow Run is designated as a High-Quality Coldwater Fishery and a Migratory Fishery. Wild trout naturally reproduce in the stream from its headwaters downstream to its mouth.

== See also ==
- Baker Run, next tributary of Bowman Creek going downstream
- Sugar Run (Bowman Creek), next tributary of Bowman Creek going upstream
- List of rivers of Pennsylvania
- List of tributaries of Bowman Creek
