= Cider Run (Bowman Creek tributary) =

River in Pennsylvania, U.S.

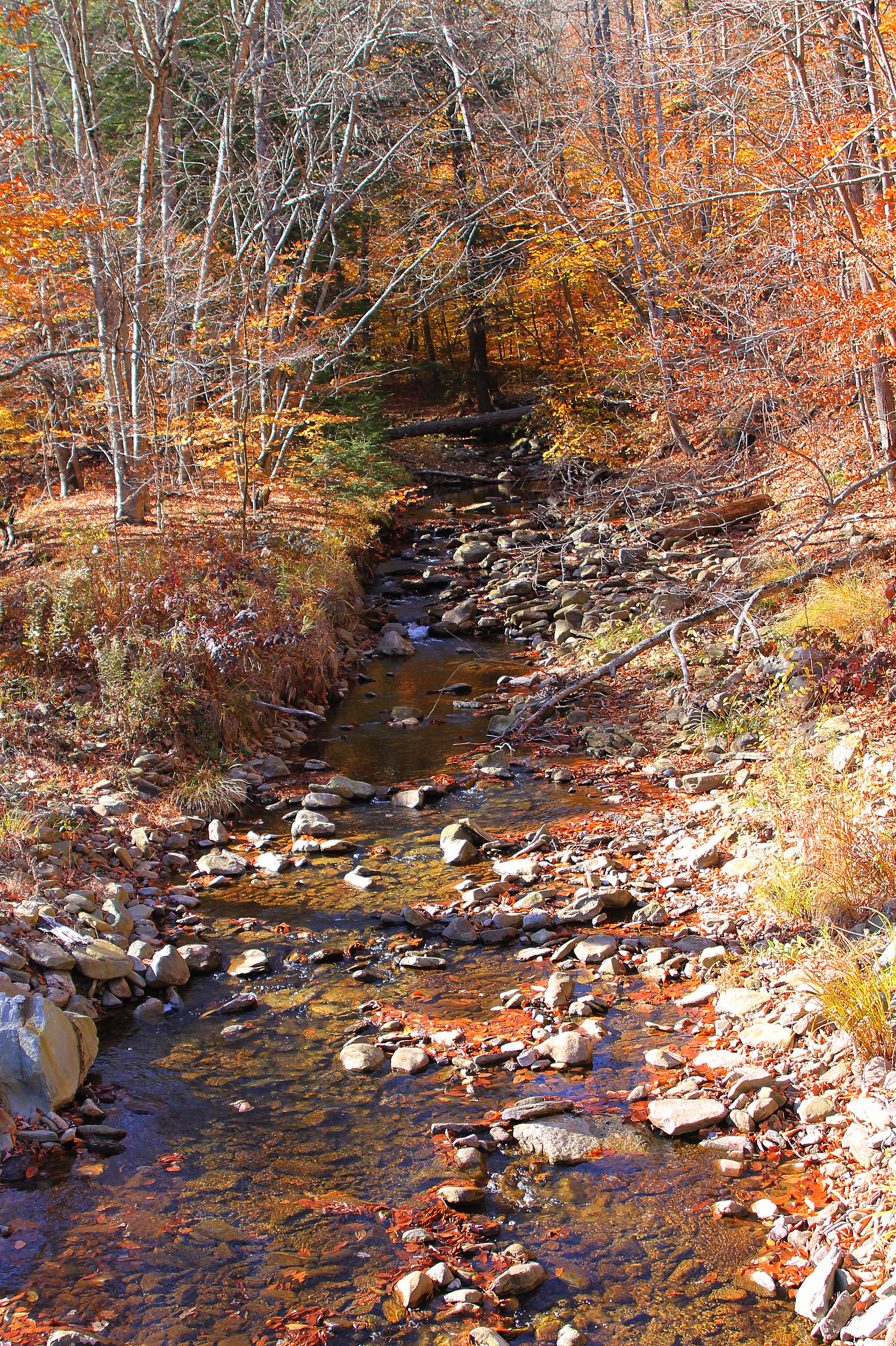
- Cider Run looking upstream in its lower reaches

Physical characteristics
- Source
  - location: valley to the west of The Stack in Forkston Township, Wyoming County, Pennsylvania
  - elevation: between 1,940 and 1,960 feet (591 and 597 m)
- Mouth
  - location: Bowman Creek near Mountain Springs in Noxen Township, Pennsylvania
  - coordinates: 41°23′03″N 76°08′38″W
  - elevation: 1,362 ft (415 m)
- Length: 2.5 mi (4.0 km)
- Basin size: 3.77 mi^{2} (9.8 km^{2})

Basin features
- Progression: Bowman Creek → Susquehanna River → Chesapeake Bay
- Tributaries
  - left: one unnamed tributary

Cider Run is a tributary of Bowman Creek in Wyoming County, Pennsylvania, in the United States. It is approximately 2.5 miles (4.0 km) long and flows through Forkston Township and Noxen Township. The watershed of the stream has an area of 3.77 square miles (9.8 km^{2}). The stream is not designated as an impaired waterbody. Its watershed is classified as Exceptional Value waters and a Migratory Fishery and the stream is designated as a Wilderness Trout Stream.

== Course ==
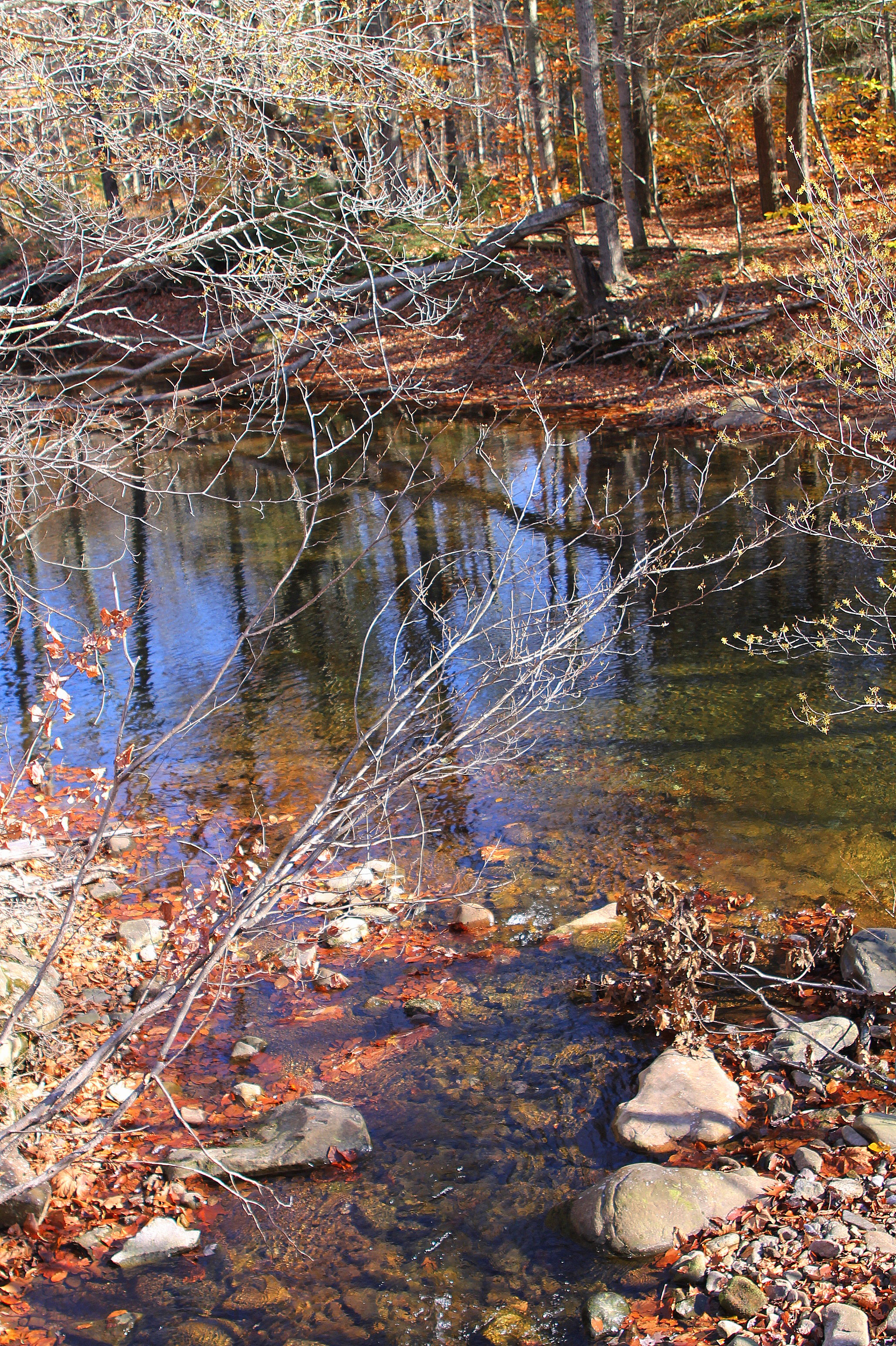
Mouth of Cider Run, with Bowman Creek in the background

Cider Run begins in a valley to the west of The Stack in Forkston Township, near the border between Wyoming County and Luzerne County. It flows northeast through the valley for several tenths of a mile before turning north-northeast. After a few tenths of a mile, the stream enters Noxen Township and a few tenths of a mile after that, it turns east-northeast, receiving an unnamed tributary from the left. Over the next several tenths of a mile, it flows around the northern edge of The Stack and turns southeast. The stream then turns south for several tenths of a mile, flowing along the eastern edge of The Stack, before turning southeast. A short distance further downstream, it reaches its confluence with Bowman Creek.

Cider Run joins Bowman Creek 19.74 miles (31.77 km) upstream of its mouth.

=== Tributaries ===
Cider Run has no named tributaries. However, it does have one unnamed tributary, which is approximately 1.4 miles (2.3 km) long and begins in a wetland.

== Hydrology ==
Cider Run is not designated as an impaired waterbody.

== Geography and geology ==
The elevation near the mouth of Cider Run is 1,362 feet (415 m) above sea level. The elevation of the stream's source is between 1,940 and 1,960 feet (591 and 597 m) above sea level.

The surficial geology in the vicinity of Cider Run mainly consists of alluvium, except in its upper reaches, where it consists of a till known as Wisconsinan Till. Wisconsinan Till occurs along the stream's valley throughout its length and is underlain by glacial lake clays in some reaches. Bedrock consisting of sandstone and shale occurs in the valley's higher elevations.

Cider Run flows through a glen that has an "interesting" rock face in one area.

== Watershed ==
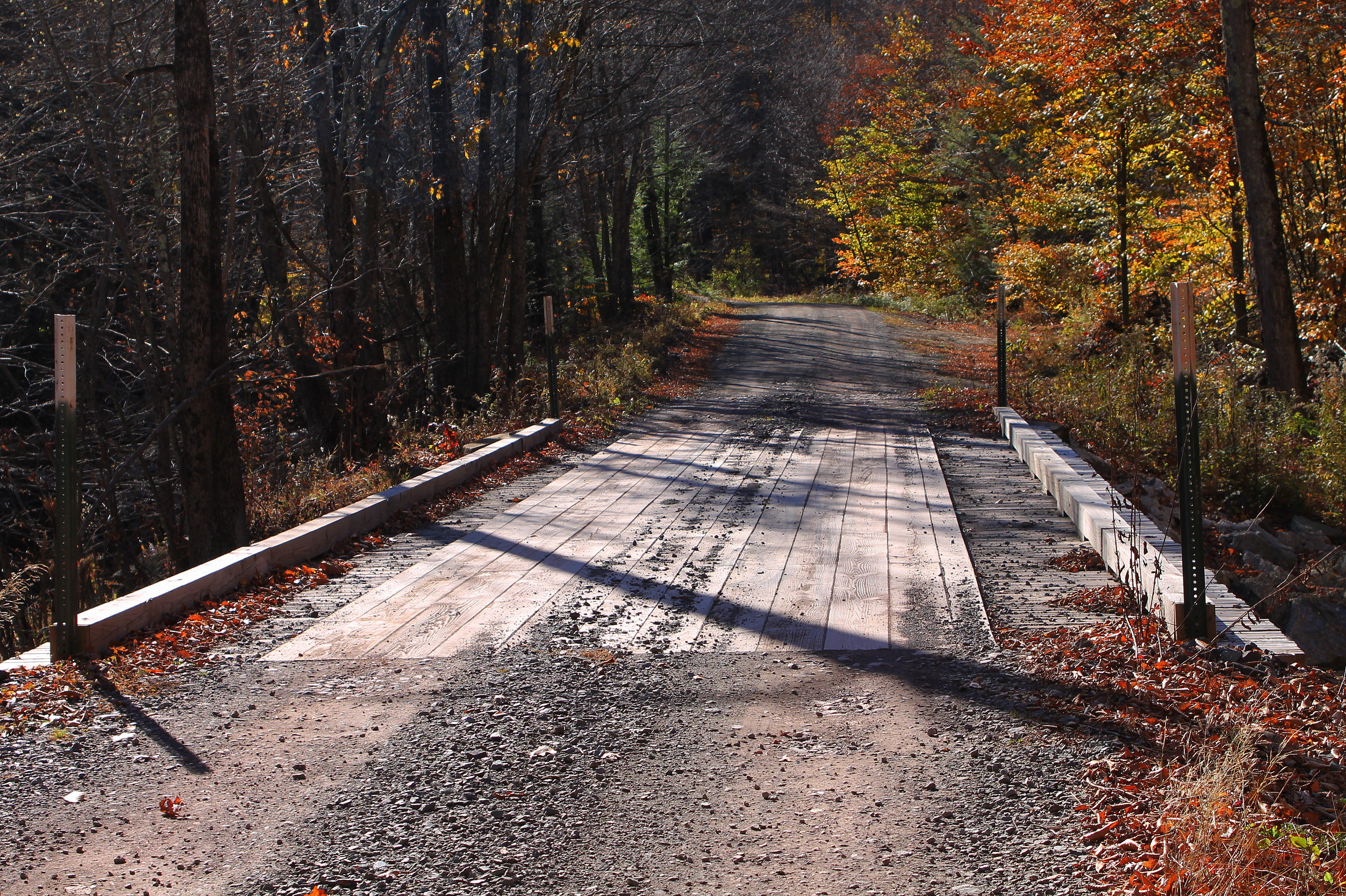
Bridge over Cider Run in its lower reaches

The watershed of Cider Run has an area of 3.77 square miles (9.8 km^{2}). The stream is entirely within the United States Geological Survey quadrangle of Dutch Mountain. The streams mouth is near Mountain Springs.

Cider Run is a small, but relatively secluded stream. The stream has been described as a "trout trickle" that cannot be accessed directly from any road.

== History and recreation ==
Cider Run was entered into the Geographic Names Information System on August 2, 1979. Its identifier in the Geographic Names Information System is 1198570.

Cider Run is situated within Pennsylvania State Game Lands Number 57. The High Knob Trail passes within sight of the stream's glen.

== Biology ==
The drainage basin of Cider Run is designated as Exceptional Value waters and a Migratory Fishery. Wild trout naturally reproduce in the stream from its headwaters downstream to its mouth. The stream is also classified as a Wilderness Trout Stream with wild brook trout. It is one of two Wilderness Trout Streams in Wyoming County, the other being Sorber Run.

Cider Run has a substantial wild trout population. When it was surveyed in 2002, its biomass class was C. The biomass of the trout was 17.55 kilograms per hectare (15.66 lb/acre).

== See also ==
- Sugar Run (Bowman Creek), next tributary of Bowman Creek going downstream
- Butternut Run, next tributary of Bowman Creek going upstream
- List of rivers of Pennsylvania
- List of tributaries of Bowman Creek
