= Sugar Run (Bowman Creek tributary) =

River in Pennsylvania, United States

- Location of Sugar Run mouth Sugar Run (Bowman Creek tributary) (the United States)

Physical characteristics
- Source
  - location: valley in Lake Township, Luzerne County, Pennsylvania
  - elevation: between 1,960 and 1,980 feet (597 and 604 m)
- Mouth
  - location: Bowman Creek in Noxen Township, Wyoming County, Pennsylvania
  - coordinates: 41°23′02″N 76°08′30″W
  - elevation: 1,358 ft (414 m)
- Length: 1.8 mi (2.9 km)
- Basin size: 1.02 sq mi (2.6 km^{2})

Basin features
- Progression: Bowman Creek → Susquehanna River → Chesapeake Bay

Sugar Run is a tributary of Bowman Creek in Luzerne County and Wyoming County, in Pennsylvania, in the United States. It is approximately 1.8 miles (2.9 km) long and flows through Lake Township in Luzerne County and Noxen Township in Wyoming County. The watershed of the stream has an area of 1.02 square miles (2.6 km^{2}). The surficial geology in its vicinity consists of alluvium, alluvial fan, Wisconsinan Till, and bedrock. The stream's watershed is designated as a High-Quality Coldwater Fishery and a Migratory Fishery.

== Course ==
Sugar Run begins in a valley in Lake Township, Luzerne County. It flows northwest for more than a mile, entering Noxen Township, Wyoming County. The stream then turns west-northwest for a short distance before turning northwest and leaving its valley. A few tenths of a mile further downstream, it gradually turns northeast and reaches its confluence with Bowman Creek.

Sugar Run joins Bowman Creek 19.68 miles (31.67 km) upstream of its mouth.

== Geography and geology ==
The elevation near the mouth of Sugar Run is 1,358 feet (414 m) above sea level. The elevation of the stream's source is between 1,960 and 1,980 feet (597 and 604 m) above sea level.

The surficial geology in the vicinity of the mouth of Sugar Run consists of alluvium and alluvial fan. Slightly further upstream, there is a till known as Wisconsinan Till, which is underlain with glacial lake clays in some reaches. In the Sweet Valley quadrangle, the stream passes through land with a surficial geology consisting of Wisconsinan Till, but bedrock consisting of sandstone and shale is not far away.

== Watershed and hydrology ==
The watershed of Sugar Run has an area of 1.02 square miles (2.6 km^{2}). The mouth of the stream is in the United States Geological Survey quadrangle of Dutch Mountain. However, its source is in the quadrangle of Harveys Lake. The stream also passes through the quadrangle of Sweet Valley. The streams mouth is located near Mountain Springs.

Sugar Run attains the requirements for use by aquatic life.

== History ==
Sugar Run was entered into the Geographic Names Information System on August 2, 1979. Its identifier in the Geographic Names Information System is 1199768.

== Biology ==
The drainage basin of Sugar Run is designated as a High-Quality Coldwater Fishery and a Migratory Fishery. Wild trout naturally reproduce in the stream from its headwaters downstream to its mouth.

== See also ==
- Broad Hollow Run, next tributary of Bowman Creek going downstream
- Cider Run (Bowman Creek), next tributary of Bowman Creek going upstream
- List of rivers of Pennsylvania
- List of tributaries of Bowman Creek
