= Baker Run =

Baker Run Windfall Run
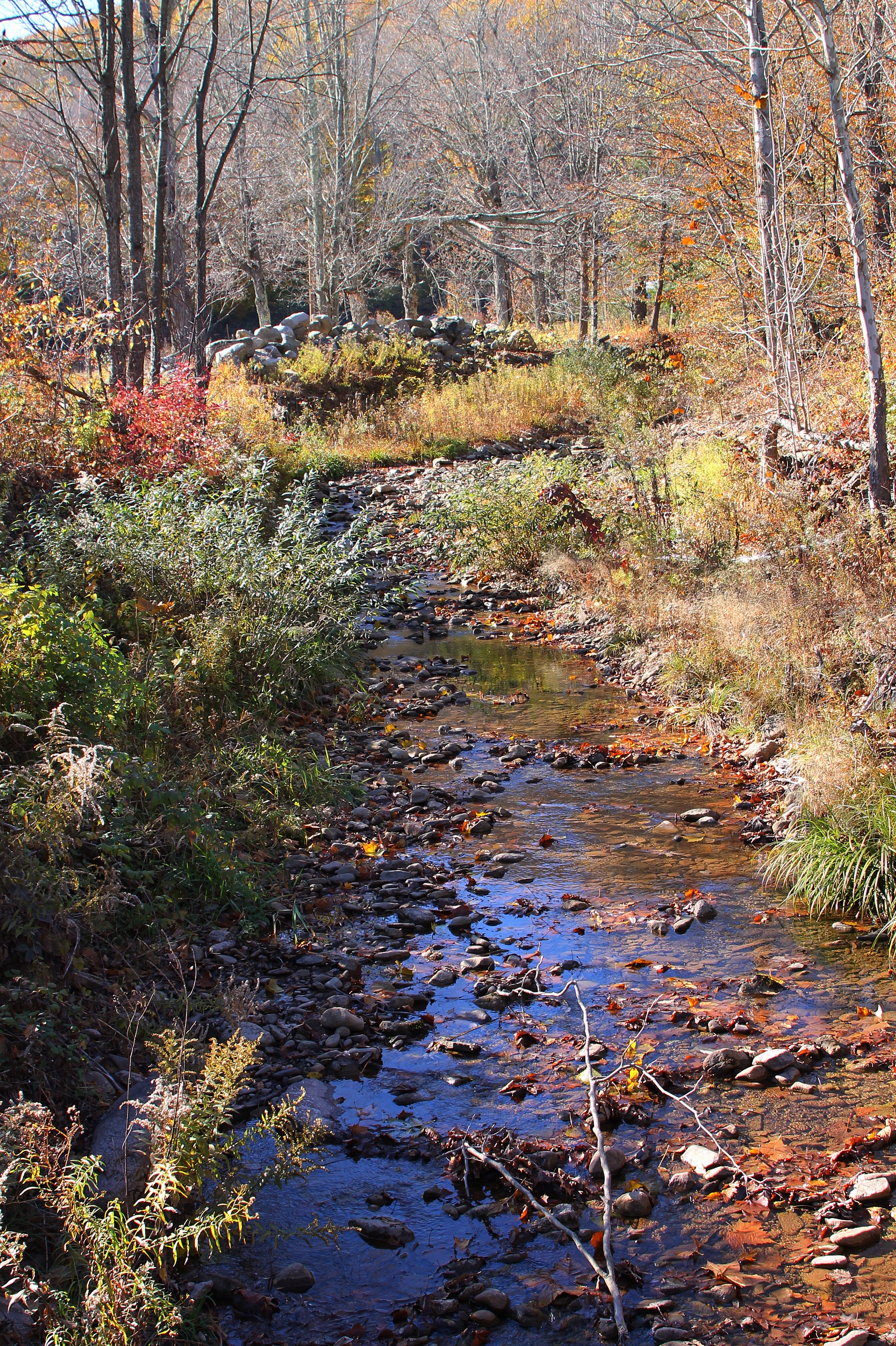
- Baker Run looking upstream in its lower reaches

Physical characteristics
- Source
  - location: Stone Mountain in Noxen Township, Wyoming County, Pennsylvania
  - elevation: between 1,580 and 1,600 feet (482 and 488 m)
- Mouth
  - location: Bowman Creek in Noxen Township, Wyoming County, Pennsylvania
  - coordinates: 41°24′03″N 76°06′50″W
  - elevation: 1,227 ft (374 m)
- Length: 1.1 mi (1.8 km)
- Basin size: 2.28 mi^{2} (5.9 km^{2})

Basin features
- Progression: Bowman Creek → Susquehanna River → Chesapeake Bay
- Tributaries
  - right: Windfall Run

Baker Run (also known as Windfall Run) is a tributary of Bowman Creek in Wyoming County, Pennsylvania, in the United States. It is approximately 1.1 miles (1.8 km) long and flows through Noxen Township. The watershed of the stream has an area of 2.28 square miles (5.9 km^{2}). The stream is not designated as an impaired waterbody. The surficial geology in its vicinity consists of alluvium, alluvial terrace, and Wisconsinan Till. Its watershed is designated as a High-Quality Coldwater Fishery and a Migratory Fishery.

== Course ==
Baker Run begins on Stone Mountain in Noxen Township. It flows south-southeast down the mountain for a few tenths of a mile before turning south and continuing to flow down the mountain. After a short distance, it enters a deep valley and receives Windfall Run, its only named tributary, from the right. The stream then turns southeast for a short distance before turning south for a short distance. It then heads in an east-northeasterly direction (although it makes several turns) for a few tenths of a mile before reaching its confluence with Bowman Creek.

Baker Run joins Bowman Creek 17.58 miles (28.29 km) upstream of its mouth.

=== Tributaries ===
Baker Run has one named tributary, which is a 1.7-mile (2.7 km) long stream known as Windfall Run. Windfall Run joins Baker Run 0.66 miles (1.06 km) upstream of its mouth and drains an area of 1.68 square miles (4.4 km^{2}).

== Hydrology ==
Baker Run is not designated as an impaired waterbody.

== Geography and geology ==
The elevation near the mouth of Baker Run is 1,227 feet (374 m) above sea level. The elevation near the source of Baker Run is between 1,580 and 1,600 feet (482 and 488 m) above sea level.

The surficial geology in the vicinity of the lower reaches of Baker Run consists of alluvium, which contains stratified sand, silt, and gravel, and alluvial terrace. Further upstream, in the middle and upper reaches, there is a till known as Wisconsinan Till, which is underlain by glacial lake clays in the vicinity of the stream's middle reaches.

== Watershed ==
The watershed of Baker Run has an area of 2.28 square miles (5.9 km^{2}). The mouth of the stream is in the United States Geological Survey quadrangle of Nxoen. However, its source is in the quadrangle of Dutch Mountain.

== History ==
Baker Run was entered into the Geographic Names Information System on August 2, 1979. Its identifier in the Geographic Names Information System is 1198348. The stream is also known as Windfall Run. This variant name appears in a 1946 United States Geological Survey map.

== Biology ==
The drainage basin of Baker Run is designated as a High-Quality Coldwater Fishery and a Migratory Fishery. Wild trout naturally reproduce in the stream from its headwaters downstream to its mouth.

== See also ==
- Sorber Run, next tributary of Bowman Creek going downstream
- Broad Hollow Run, next tributary of Bowman Creek going upstream
- List of rivers of Pennsylvania
- List of tributaries of Bowman Creek
