= Bowman Creek =

Bowman Creek Bowmans Creek, Bowman's Creek
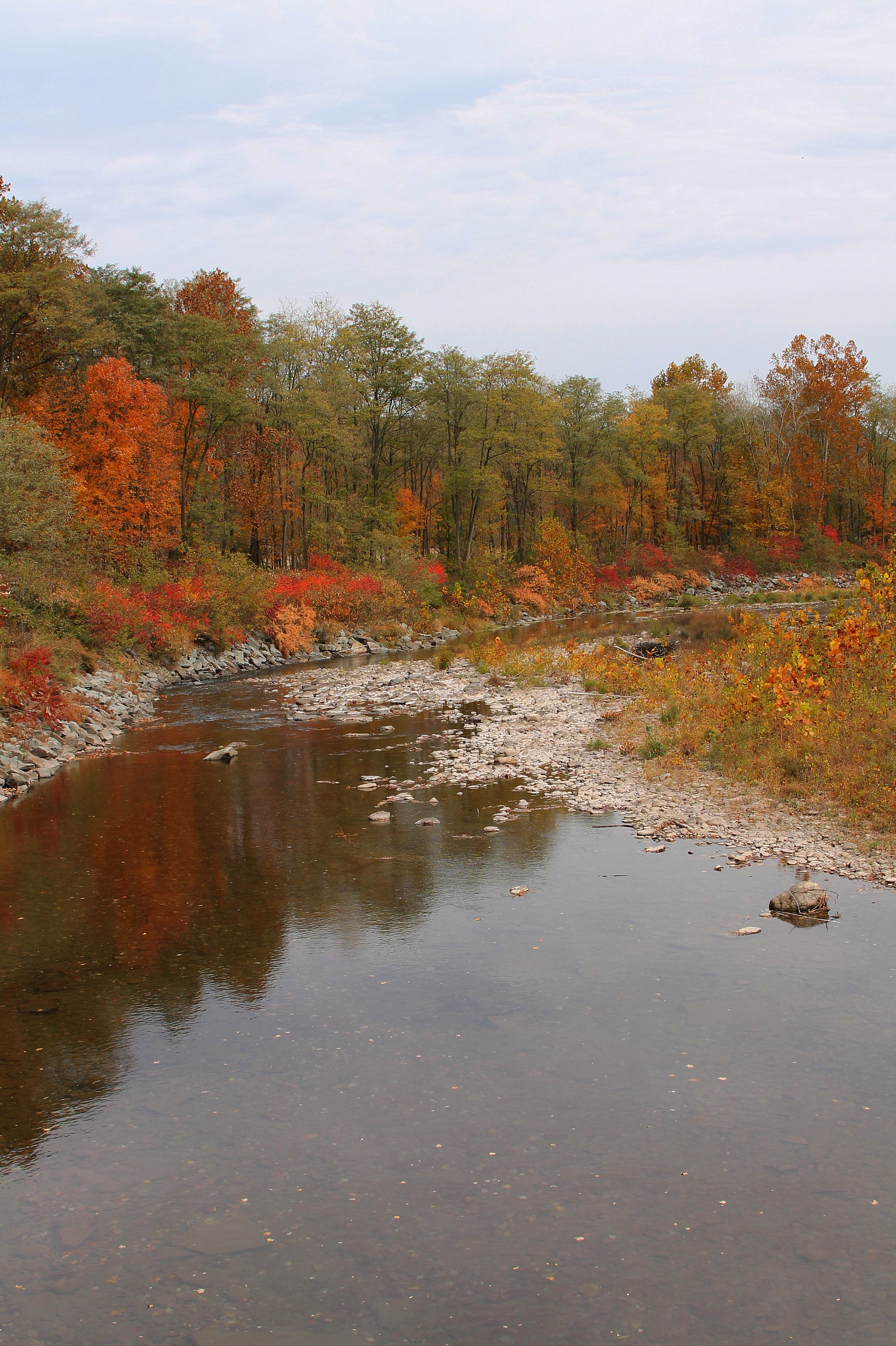
- Bowman Creek looking downstream near its mouth

Physical characteristics
- Source
  - location: confluence of North Branch Bowman Creek and South Branch Bowman Creek in Ross Township, Luzerne County, Pennsylvania
  - elevation: between 1,840 and 1,860 feet (561 and 567 m)
- Mouth
  - location: Susquehanna River in Eaton Township, Wyoming County, Pennsylvania
  - coordinates: 41°30′59″N 75°56′39″W
  - elevation: 584 ft (178 m)
- Length: 26.4 mi (42.5 km)
- Basin size: 120 mi^{2} (310 km^{2})
- Discharge
  - average: average annual discharge, middle reaches 89.9 cu ft/s (2.55 m^{3}/s)

Basin features
- Progression: Susquehanna River → Chesapeake Bay
- Tributaries
  - left: North Branch Bowman Creek, Bean Run, Wolf Run, Cider Run, Baker Run, Stone Run, York Run, Hettesheimer Run, Roaring Run, Sugar Hollow Creek, Benson Hollow
  - right: South Branch Bowman Creek, Beth Run, Butternut Run, Sugar Run, Broad Hollow Run, Sorber Run, Beaver Run, South Run, Leonard Creek, Marsh Creek

Bowman Creek (also known as Bowmans Creek or Bowman's Creek) is a tributary of the Susquehanna River in Luzerne County and Wyoming County, in Pennsylvania, in the United States. It is approximately 26 miles (42 km) long and flows through Ross Township and Lake Township in Luzerne County and Noxen Township, Monroe Township, and Eaton Township in Wyoming County. The watershed of the creek has an area of 120 square miles (310 km^{2}). The creek is not designated as an impaired waterbody and its pH is close to neutral, although it has experienced some problems with acid rain. It has low concentrations of dissolved solids like calcium. The creek is relatively small in its upper reaches, but by Noxen, its width is 40 to 60 feet (12 to 18 m). It is also relatively shallow in many reaches. Rock formations in the watershed include the Catskill Formation, the Huntley Mountain Formation, Burgoon Sandstone, the Mauch Chunk Formation, the Pottsville Group, and the Pocono Formation. Soil associations in the creek's watershed include the Wellsboro-Morris-Oquaga association, the Oquaga-Lackawanna-Arnot association, the Mardin-Bath-Volusia association, and the Wyoming-Pope association.

The dominant land use in the watershed of Bowman Creek is forested land, which occupies nearly 90 percent of its area. Minor land uses in the watershed include meadows, agricultural land, and many others. Most of the development in the watershed is clustered along the highways that run through it. The creek has, on occasion, experienced major flooding. Bowman Creek was visible on maps by 1791, and there were a number of settlers in its vicinity by the early 1800s. Historically, industries in the creek's watershed included lumbering, agriculture, tanneries, gristmills, and ice harvesting. Numerous bridges have been constructed over Bowman Creek. The Bowmans Creek Watershed Association is active within the creek's watershed.

The main stem of Bowman Creek is designated as a High-Quality Coldwater Fishery and a Migratory Fishery, as are most of its tributaries. The creek is inhabited by brook trout, brown trout, and rainbow trout and reaches of it are stocked with trout. The creek is well known in the area for its significance as a trout stream. Reaches of it are also navigable by canoe. Parts of the creek are in Pennsylvania State Game Lands Number 57 and Ricketts Glen State Park.

== Course ==
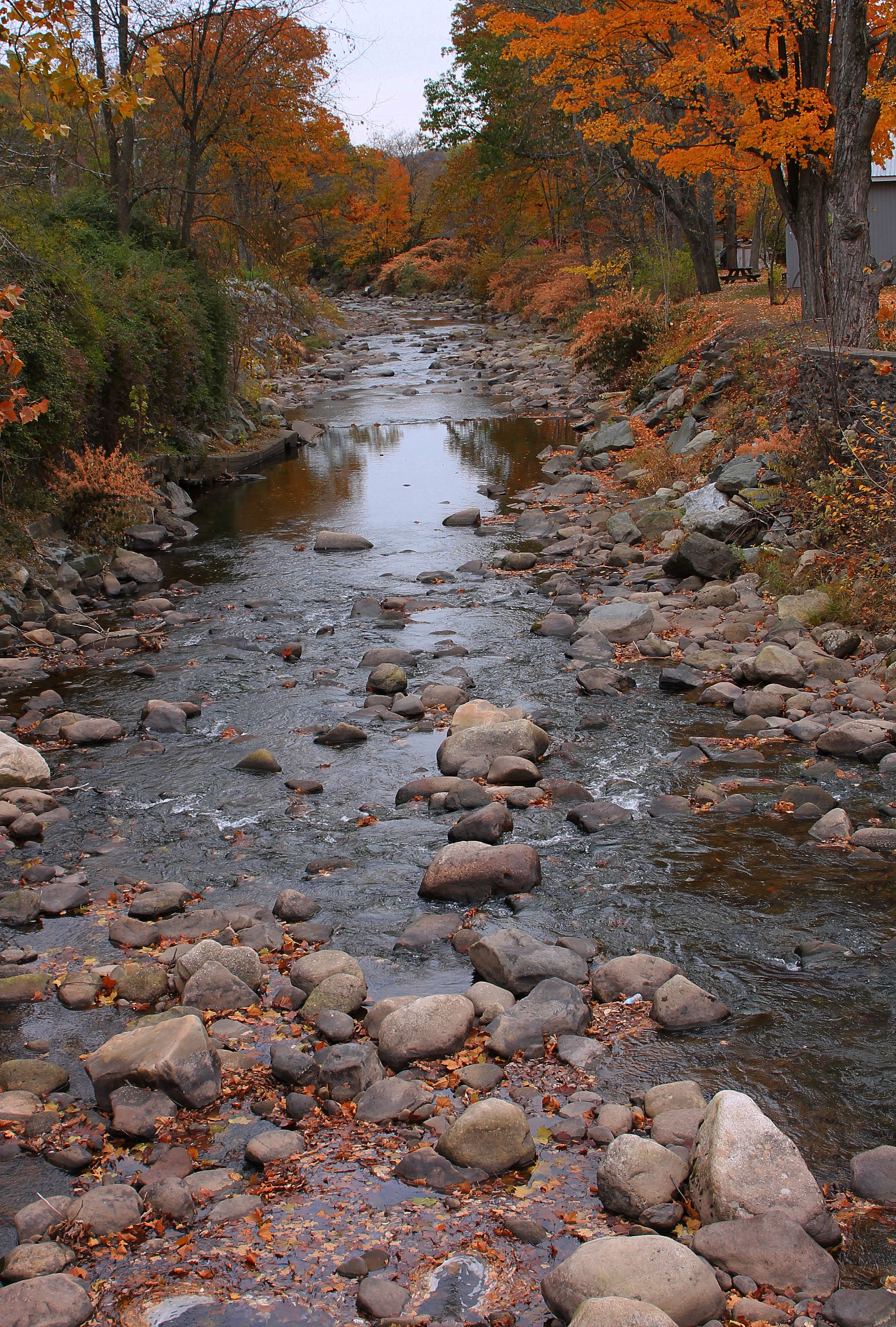
Bowman Creek looking downstream in Noxen

Bowman Creek begins in Ross Township, Luzerne County at the mouths of North Branch Bowman Creek and South Branch Bowman Creek on North Mountain. It flows northeast for some distance, passing through a lake and receiving the tributary Bean Run. A short distance later, it turns roughly east for a couple of miles, receiving the tributary Wolf Run. The creek then turns northeast for a few miles, entering Lake township, Luzerne County. In this township, it receives the tributaries Beth Run and Butternut Run. It then turns north and on the northern edge of the township, the creek leaves Lake Township and Luzerne County.

Upon leaving Luzerne County, Bowman Creek enters Noxen Township, Wyoming County. It almost immediately receives the tributaries Sugar Run and Cider Run and then turns northeast. Continuing northeast, the creek picks up the tributaries Broud Hollow Run, Windfall Run, and Sober Run and also passes by Stone Mountain. It then turns north-northeast and picks up Stone Run, passing by the community of Stull. The creek then turns roughly east for a few miles and its valley widens as it passes through the community of Noxen. In Noxen, the creek receives the tributaries York Run, Hettesheiner Run, and Beaver Run. Upon exiting Noxen, the creek enters Monroe Township, Wyoming County. In this township, it picks up the tributary South Run and turns north, flowing parallel to Pennsylvania Route 29. As the creek passes between Schooley Mountain and Brier Mountain, it receives the tributary Leopard Creek. Some distance later, it turns northeast and enters Eaton Township, Wyoming County. In this township, the creek turns east and then north for a few miles. It then turns east for a few miles and reaches its confluence with the Susquehanna River.

Bowman Creek joins the Susquehanna River 218.00 miles (350.84 km) upstream of its mouth.

== Hydrology ==
Bowman Creek is not designated as an impaired waterbody. However, in the creek's middle or upper reaches, 0.3 miles (0.48 km) of streams are impaired by atmospheric deposition. The upper reaches of the creek experience seasonal acidity problems. During the summer months, the creek is shallow and clear. John Levitsky, a member of the Luzerne County Conservation Association, has sprinkled limestone on roads to raise the pH of the creek. Since the late 1990s, tons of limestone have been dumped into the creek by the Bowman Creek Watershed Association and a chapter of Trout Unlimited.

In a one-year period in 1918 and 1919, the maximum gauge height of Bowman Creek at Eatonville was 5.07 feet (1.55 m). The minimum gauge height was 1.75 feet (0.53 m).

Bowman Creek is classified as a freestone stream. It is typical for a freestone stream in that it contains few dissolved substances such as calcium and that its pH is close to neutral.

The average annual discharge of Bowman Creek in its middle reaches is 89.9 cubic feet per second (2.55 m^{3}/s). The maximum flow time from the creek's headwaters to a point in its middle reaches is 23 hours and 19 minutes. In the mid-1970s, the turbidity of the creek near Tunkhannock ranged from 2 to 30 Jackson Turbidity Units. The specific conductance of the creek ranged from 45 to 150 micro-siemens per centimeter at 25 °C (77 °F). The pH was close to neutral, ranging from 6.6 to 7.3.

In the mid-1970s, the concentration of dissolved oxygen in Bowman Creek near Tunkhannock ranged from 11.0 to 11.6 milligrams per liter (0.0110 to 0.0116 oz/cu ft). The carbon dioxide concentration ranged from 1.8 to 5.9 milligrams per liter (0.0018 to 0.0059 oz/cu ft). The concentration of organic carbon was 3.0 milligrams per liter (0.0030 oz/cu ft) and the phosphorus concentration ranged from 0.03 to 0.14 milligrams per liter (3.0×10^{−5} to 0.000140 oz/cu ft). The ammonia concentration ranged from 0.051 to 0.232 milligrams per liter (5.1×10^{−5} to 0.000232 oz/cu ft).

In the mid-1970s, the concentration of magnesium and calcium in Bowman Creek near Tunkhannock ranged from 1.5 to 2.5 milligrams per liter (0.0015 to 0.0025 oz/cu ft) and 5.6 to 16.8 milligrams per liter (0.0056 to 0.0168 oz/cu ft), respectively. The iron concentration ranged from less than 20 micrograms per liter (2.0×10^{−5} oz/cu ft) to 1,460 micrograms per liter (0.00146 oz/cu ft). The sulfate and chloride concentrations ranged from 8 to 16 milligrams per liter (0.0080 to 0.0160 oz/cu ft) and 4 to 11 milligrams per liter (0.0040 to 0.0110 oz/cu ft), respectively.

As of 2010, Cabot Oil & Gas withdraws 290,000 US gallons (1,100,000 L) from Bowman Creek per day for gas drilling operations. There were some complaints about the company withdrawing too much water, but the withdrawals were found to not impact the creek.

== Geography, geology, and climate ==
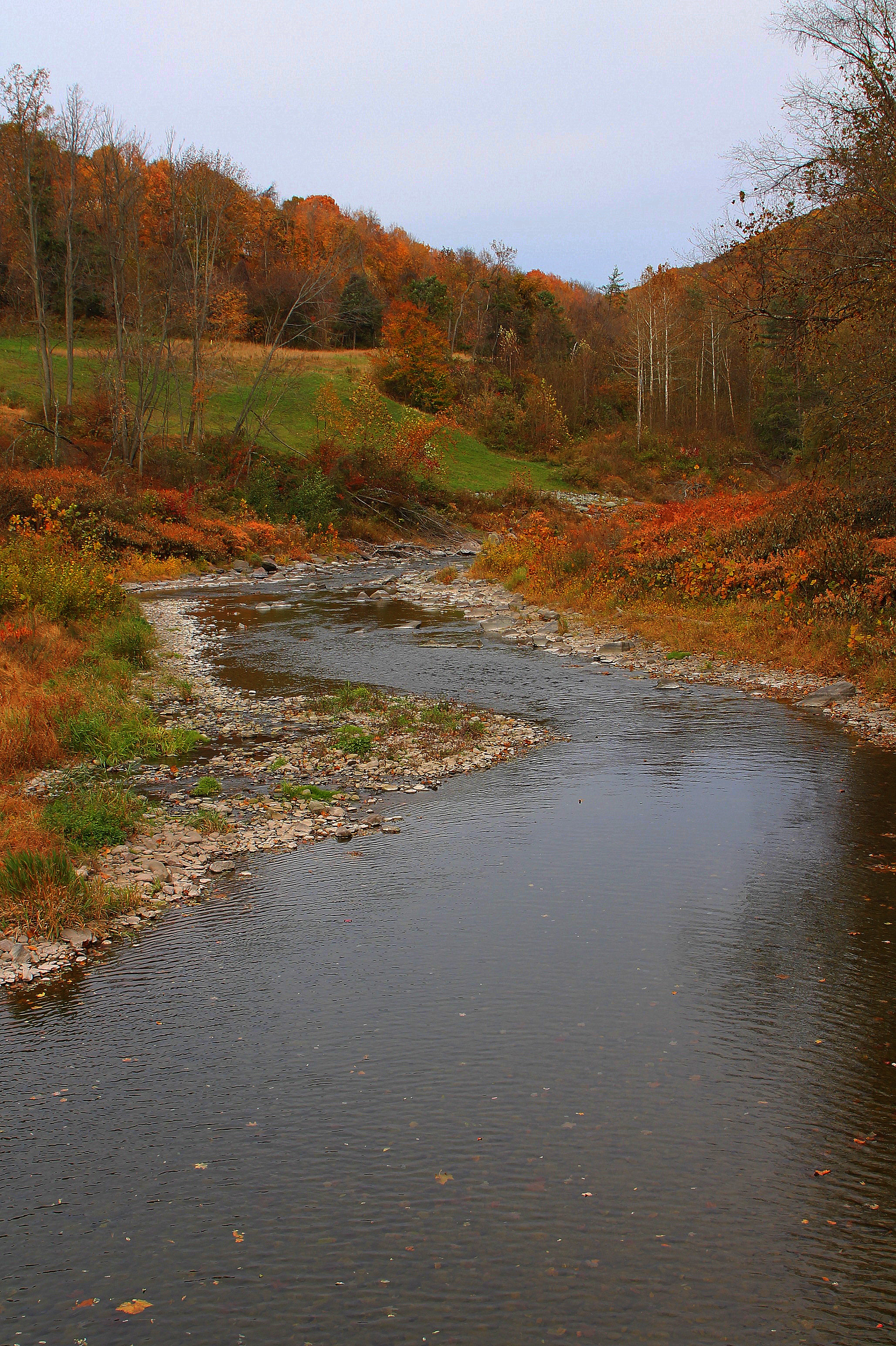
Bowman Creek in Eaton Township, Wyoming County

The elevation near the mouth of Wyoming Creek is 584 feet (178 m) above sea level. The elevation of the creek's source is between 1,840 and 1,860 feet (561 and 567 m). Between 1,900 feet (580 m) above sea level (river mile 25.5) and 640 feet (200 m) above sea level (river mile 3.5), the creek's elevation decreases at a rate of 57.3 feet (17.5 m) per mile. The highest elevation in the watershed is approximately 2,470 feet (750 m) above sea level, on North Mountain. The lowest elevation is approximately 570 feet (170 m) above sea level, near the Susquehanna River. Many of the highest elevations occur in the western and southwestern parts of the creek's watershed.

Bowman Creek is a relatively small creek, about the size of a brook, in its upper reaches. However, by the time it reaches Stull, it is 40 feet (12 m) wide and by the time it reaches Noxen, the creek has a width of 40 to 60 feet (12 to 18 m). There are several deep holes along the creek, as well as oxygen-rich riffles.

Many reaches of Bowman Creek are shallow enough for wading. However, its currents can be swift at times. There is at least one area of the creek consistently has cool and deep waters.

A portion of Bowman Creek is on the plateau of North Mountain. The creek flows through a deep valley that somewhat resembles a gorge. The stream banks of the creek have riprap in some places. Houses line the creek in places as well. A waterfall known as Evans Falls is situated on Bowman Creek. It is 8 feet (2.4 m) high. Additionally, there are strainers on portions of the creek. At Eatonville, the creek has high streambanks and a streambed of gravel. The creek's valley is 2 to 3 miles (3.2 to 4.8 km) wide.

The topography of the watershed of Bowman Creek is described as "rough and hilly" in a 1921 book. There are steep hills in the upper reaches of the watershed, but gentle slopes on the valley floor. There are some small lakes such as Rymans Pond, which has a surface area of 77 acres (31 ha). A number of swamps are also present in the watershed. The area contains a narrow valley surrounded by hills that are between 800 feet (240 m) and 1,000 feet (300 m) in height. Glaciation has affected the watershed in the past.

The channel of Bowman Creek is sinuous, with alluvial floodplains in some areas. The creek flows through rock formations made of sandstone and shale. Glacial drift is also present in the watershed. Interbedded sedimentary rock and sandstone are prevalent in the creek's watershed. Copper ore has been discovered in the vicinity of the creek.

The most common rock formation in the watershed of Bowman Creek is the Catskill Formation, which occupies most of the eastern part of the watershed. Further to the west, there is a sizable band of the Huntley Mountain Formation, which also occurs in a few small patches further to the east. On the westernmost and southwesternmost fringe of the watershed, there is a band of Burgoon Sandstone. Other rock formations occupy far smaller areas. The Mauch Chunk Formation occurs in a few tiny patches along the western and southwestern edges of the watershed, and one tiny patch of the Pottsville Group occurs on the watershed's western edge as well. In the northern part of the creek's watershed, there are four small patches of the Pocono Formation.

There are four different soil associations in the watershed of Bowman Creek: the Wellsboro-Morris-Oquaga association, the Oquaga-Lackawanna-Arnot association, the Mardin-Bath-Volusia association, and the Wyoming-Pope association. The Wellsboro-Morris-Oquaga association is prevalent in the eastern part of the creek's watershed, while the Oquaga-Lackawanna-Arnot association occurs in the western part of the watershed. The Mardin-Bath-Volusia occurs on rolling uplands north of Harveys Lake, and the Wyoming-Pope Association occurs in terraces and floodplains along the creek. The first two soil associations are the most common in the creek's watershed.

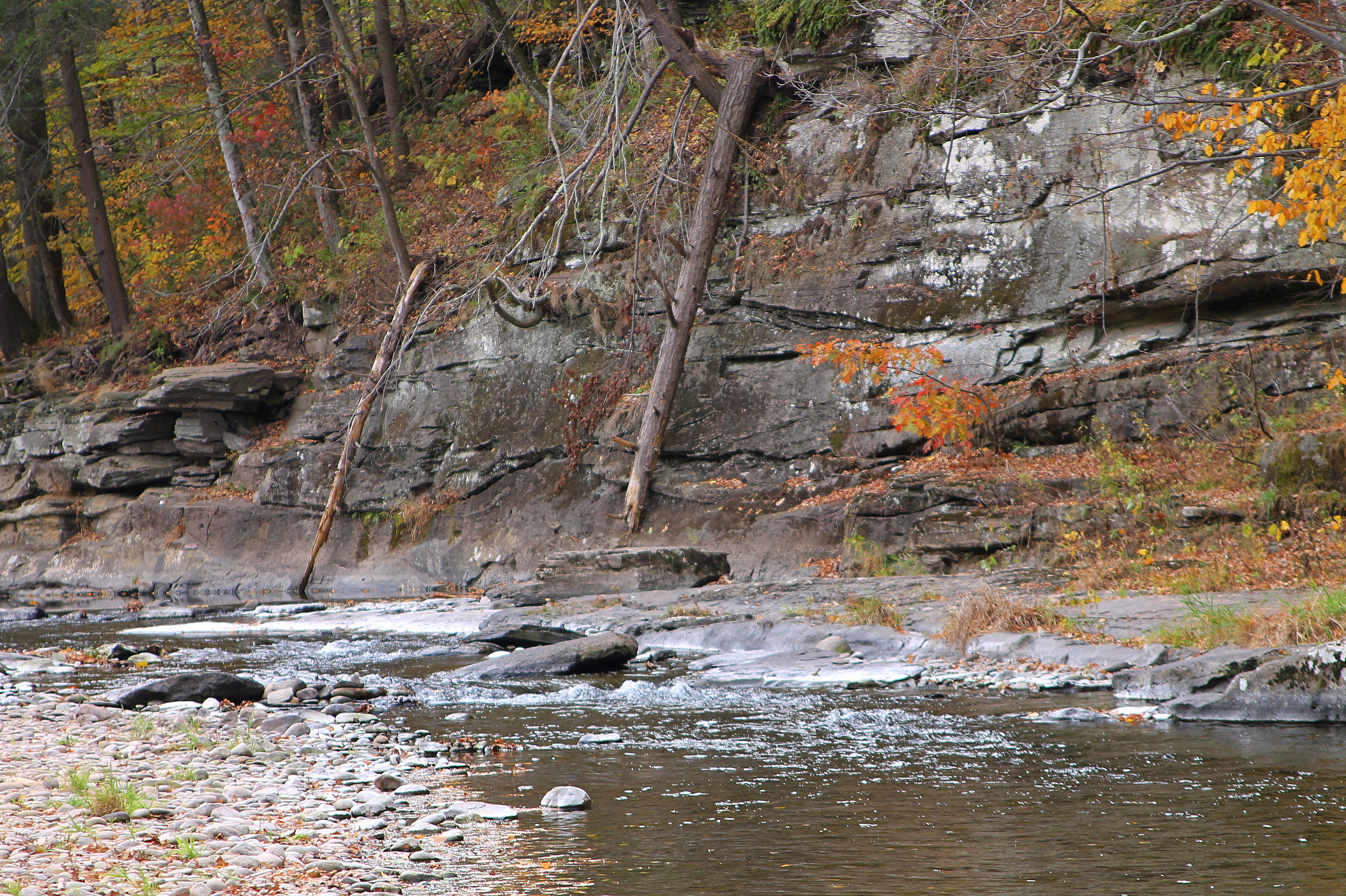
Bowman Creek Ledges

Bowman Creek is at the eastern boundary of the North Mountain region of Pennsylvania. To the east of the creek, there are considerably lower mountains, such as Bowman's Mountain and Eaton Knob. There is also a high divide between Bowman Creek and Mehoopany Creek. A steep, east-facing slope known as the Bowman Creek Ledges is located along the creek in Eaton Township, Wyoming County. These ledges are made of sandstone and shale.

Major dams in the watershed of Bowman Creek include the Lake Catalpa Dam, the Beech Lake Dam, The Meadows Dam, Splash Dam, and Splash Dam No. 2. Some reaches of the creek have been channelized. Bowman Creek is somewhat narrower than the nearby Mehoopany Creek.

The annual rate of precipitation in the watershed of Bowman Creek ranges between 45 inches (110 cm) and 55 inches (140 cm). In two measurements in the mid-1970s, the water temperature of the creek near Tunkhannock ranged from 4.5 to 22.5 °C (40.1 to 72.5 °F).

== Watershed ==
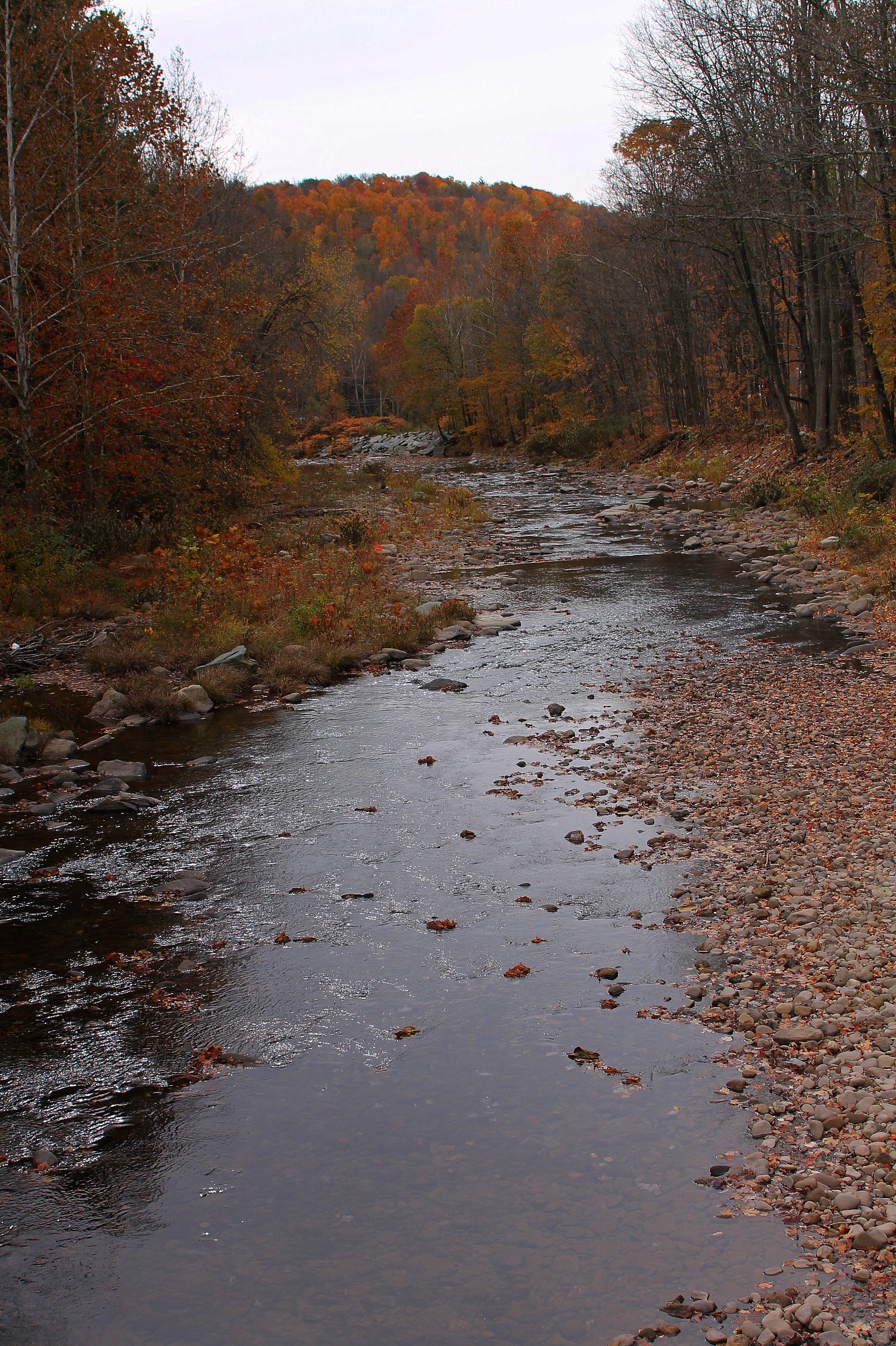
Bowman Creek below Noxen

The watershed of Bowman Creek has an area of 120 square miles (310 km^{2}). The watershed is in northwestern Luzerne County and southern Wyoming County. The drainage basin of the creek is part of the Upper North Branch Susquehanna River drainage basin. In the upper 54 square miles (140 km^{2}) of the creek's watershed, there are 73 miles (117 km) of streams. In 2010, the population of this segment of the watershed was 2667.

The mouth of Bowman Creek is in the United States Geological Survey quadrangle of Tunkhannock. However, its source is in the quadrangle of Sweet Valley. The creek also passes through the quadrangles of Center Moreland and Noxen. There are twelve municipalities in the watershed of the creek. Six of these (Fairmount Township, Ross Township, Lake Township, Harveys Lake, Dallas Township, and Franklin Township) are in Luzerne County, while the other six (Noxen Township, Monroe Township, Northmoreland Township, Forkston Township, Eaton Township, and Mehoopany Township) are in Wyoming County.

The most common land use in the watershed of Bowman Creek is forested land, which occupies 99.30 square miles (257.2 km^{2}), or 82.98 percent of the watershed. Another 12.52 square miles (32.4 km^{2}), or 10.46 percent, consists of meadows, while R-1 tracts of 2 to 4 acres (0.81 to 1.62 ha) make up 3.21 square miles (8.3 km^{2}), or 2.68 percent of the watershed. Agricultural land makes up 3.10 square miles (8.0 km^{2}) (2.59 percent of the watershed), water occupies 0.71 square miles (1.8 km^{2}) (0.60 percent of the watershed), and farmsteads occupy 0.23 square miles (0.60 km^{2}) (0.19 percent of the watershed). Orchards occupy 0.16 square miles (0.41 km^{2}) (0.13 percent of the watershed), commercial land occupies 0.12 square miles (0.31 km^{2}) (0.10 percent of the creek's watershed). R-2 tracts of 0.5 to 1 acre (0.20 to 0.40 ha) also make up 0.12 square miles (0.31 km^{2}) (0.10 percent of the creek's watershed), while mining land makes up 0.07 square miles (0.18 km^{2}) (0.06 percent of the watershed). Open space and R-4 tracts of less than 0.125 acres (0.051 ha) each occupy 0.05 square miles (0.13 km^{2}) (0.04 percent of the watershed), while R-3 tracts of 0.25 to 0.33 acres (0.10 to 0.13 ha) makes up 0.04 square miles (0.10 km^{2}) (0.03 percent of the watershed).

Most of the residential and commercial development in the watershed of Bowman Creek is clustered along Pennsylvania Route 29, Pennsylvania Route 292, and Pennsylvania Route 309. As of 2000, agricultural land in the creek's watershed is becoming less common, as it is being converted to residential land. Many wetlands on the National Wetlands Inventory are in the creek's watershed. Some forests in the creek's watershed are on private land, and most of these areas are posted against trespassing. Most of the creek upstream of Noxen flows through forested land. However, downstream of Noxen, the creek flows through forested land, farms, and small settlements. Some reaches in this area are also posted.

There are at least three natural gas drilling pads in the watershed of Bowman Creek. There seven groundwater withdrawals and no surface water withdrawals for public water supply in the upper 54 square miles (140 km^{2}) of the watershed. A gravel road runs from the community of Stull up to the headwaters of the creek. A lake known as Mountain Springs Lake is in the upper reaches of the creek's watershed, although it is currently dry. On the main stem of Bowman Creek, near the confluence of North Branch Bowman Creek and South Branch Bowman Creek, is Ice Dam No. 1, which is also dry. Further downstream, the creek flows over splash dams.

Bowman Creek has been known to flood "from time to time". However, because the creek's floodplain is not developed, such floods typically cause a relatively small amount of damage. A flood on the creek in 1850 carried away many buildings such as houses, barns, and mills. In the 2000s, the creek and its tributaries experienced significant damage due to major flooding. The creek also experienced flooding in Noxen due to Hurricane Irene in 2011.

Major roads providing access to Bowman Creek include Pennsylvania Route 309, Pennsylvania Route 29, and Pennsylvania Route 292. There are no mining sites in the vicinity of the creek.

Bowman Creek has been described as a "very pristine" stream.

== History and industries ==
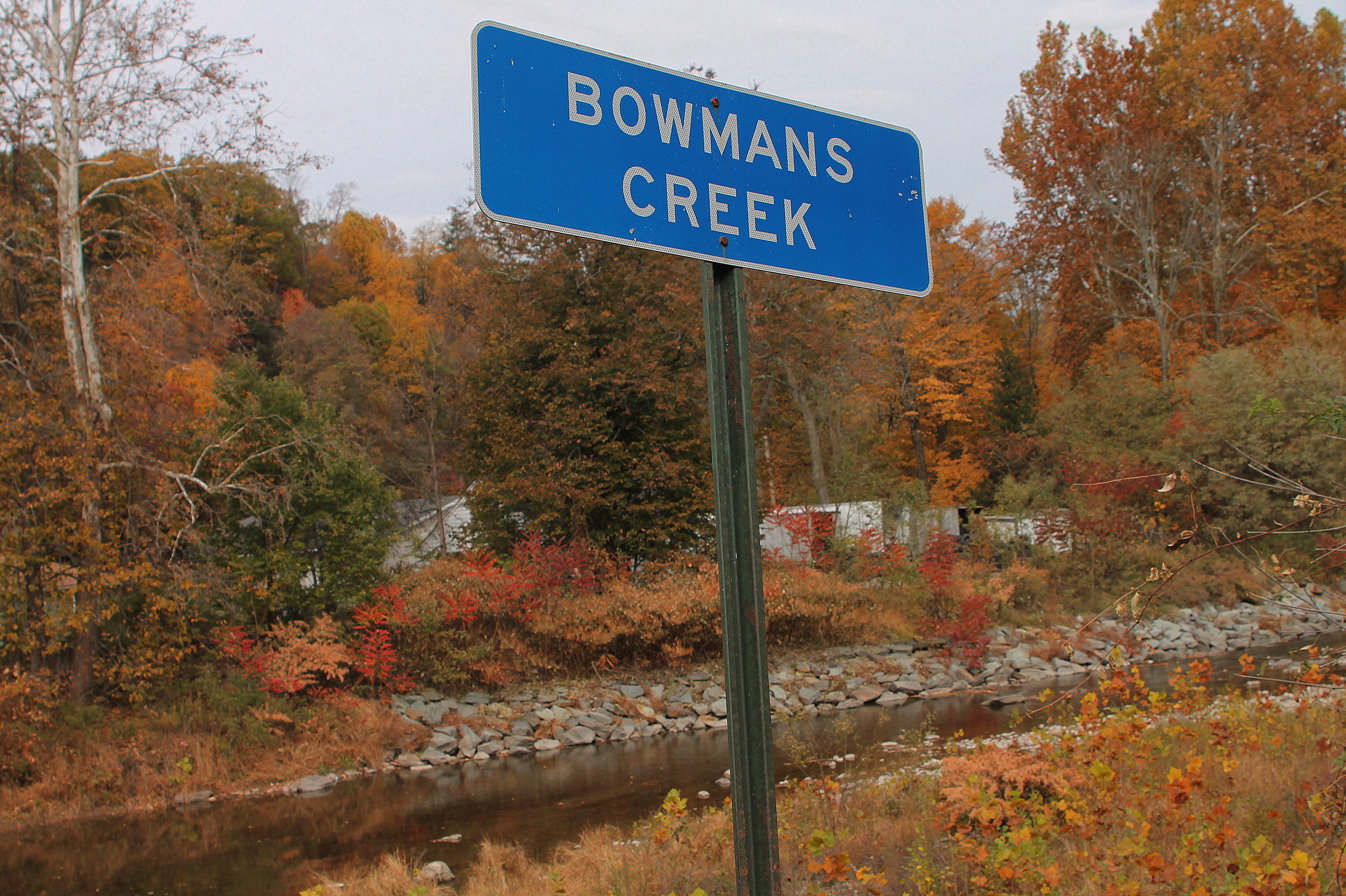
Sign showing "Bowmans Creek", an alternative name for Bowman Creek

Bowman Creek was entered into the Geographic Names Information System on August 2, 1979. Its identifier in the Geographic Names Information System is 1198468. The creek is also known as Bowmans Creek or Bowman's Creek. The first of these variant names appears in a county highway map published by the Pennsylvania Department of Transportation.

Bowman Creek appeared on maps as early as 1791. By 1794, Thomas Pickering and a group of fifty others were raising money to build bridges over Bowman Creek. By the early 1800s, there were a few settlers in the valley of Bowman Creek. However, the land was poor and most inhabitants were located near the Susquehanna River. A surveyor named Josiah Newberry was one of the first settlers to arrive in Monroe Township, Wyoming County; he settled on the creek in 1813. The first post office in Monroe Township was located on Bowman Creek and was named after the creek.

There was a lumbering industry in the watershed of Bowman Creek by the late 1800s. In 1876, the Lehigh Valley Railroad purchased 13,000 acres (5,300 ha) of timbering land in the vicinity of the creek. Until the early 1890s, when rail lines reached the area, the lumbering industry used splash dams, creek freshets, and wagons to transport their lumber to the market. In 1885, the Lehigh Valley Railroad surveyed several routes from the Wyoming Valley to Bowman Creek. Several other railroad companies at the time also had interest in such a railroad.

By 1892, there was a railroad running to Noxen, on Bowman Creek. This railroad was known as the Bowman's Creek Branch and it was abandoned in 1963.

In the early 1900s, the main industries in the watershed of Bowman Creek included tannery and agriculture. The creek and its tributary Hettesheimer Run were used as an industrial supply in the community of Noxen during this time period. Additionally, the creek's water flow powered a gristmill. The Lehigh Valley Railroad passed through the watershed of the creek and ran parallel to it in its upper reaches in the early 1900s. The Noxen railroad depot was constructed in 1893 in the creek's watershed and is now owned by the North Branch Land Trust. Splash dams on the creek historically supplied ice to the Wyoming Valley.

In the early 1900s, the major communities in the watershed of Bowman Creek included Noxen, Beaumont, and Eatonville. In 1921, their populations were 500, 208, and 161, respectively. A gauging station was established on Bowman Creek at Eatonville in January 1914. In 1962, a tannery spill on the creek killed nearly 300 legal trout.

A steel truss bridge carrying Church Drive crosses Bowman Creek 2 miles (3.2 km) southwest of Tunkhannock and is closed to traffic. A steel stringer/multi-beam or girder bridge carrying State Route 3002 was built over the creek in Noxen Township, Wyoming County in 1933. A steel truss bridge carrying Pennsylvania Route 29 across the creek was built in 1936 in Eaton Township, Wyoming County and was repaired in 1985 and a two-span steel girder and floorbeam system carrying the same road over the creek was built in 1937 in the same township. In 1975, a two-span prestressed box beam or girders bridge carrying State Route 2007 was constructed across in Eaton Township. This bridge was repaired in 2007. In 1992, a two-span steel stringer/multi-beam or girder bridge carrying Pennsylvania Route 29 was built across the creek in Monroe Township, Wyoming County. A prestressed box beam or girders bridge carrying State Route 3003 was built over Bowman Creek in 1994 in Eaton Township. In 1996, a bridge of a similar type was built over the creek in Monroe Township, carrying Pennsylvania Route 292. Yet another bridge of this type was constructed over the creek in 2004; this bridge is 1.75 miles (2.82 km) southwest of Noxen and carries T-310/Sorber Mountain Road. Another prestressed box beam or girders bridge, this one carrying Pennsylvania Route 29 was built over Bowman Creek in Monroe Township in 2006.

A watershed association known as the Bowman's Creek Watershed Association is active in the watershed of Bowman Creek. The Act 167 stormwater management plan for Bowman Creek was written in 2000. At that time, there were few measures for stormwater control in the creek's watershed. As of 2000, there are no flood control projects in the creek's watershed. At the time, there were no such projects planned for the next ten years.

== Biology ==
The main stem of Bowman Creek is designated as a High-Quality Coldwater Fishery and a Migratory Fishery, as are most of its tributaries. However, the tributaries Cider Run and Sorber Run are Exceptional Value waters. Wild trout naturally reproduce in the creek from its headwaters downstream to its mouth. Various reaches of the creek have also been stocked with brook trout, brown trout, and rainbow trout. In 1919, a brown trout with a length of 24 inches (61 cm) and a weight of more than 4 pounds (1.8 kg) was caught in the creek and a 23.25-inch (59.1 cm) brown trout weighing nearly 5 pounds (2.3 kg) was caught on Bowman Creek in or before 1945.

In the 1800s, the Luzerne County Sportsmans' Association stocked thousands of California salmon in Bowman Creek. As of the early 1990s, Bowman Creek is only stocked as far upstream as a point 3.5 miles (5.6 km) upstream of Stull, on the Luzerne County/Wyoming County line. However, it is stocked as far downstream as the mouth, 18 miles (29 km) further downstream. The Pennsylvania Fish and Boat Commission stocks trout before the opening day of the fishing season, as well as twice during the fishing season. Trout are not stocked in the uppermost reaches of the creek, but fair numbers of wild trout occur there. Wild trout occur in relatively low numbers on the main stem, but are more common in its tributaries.

Upstream of Stull, brook trout are most common on Bowman Creek. From Stull to Noxen, brook trout and brown trout are equally common. Below Noxen, brown trout are predominant. Wild rainbow trout occur in the lower reaches, primarily due to natural reproduction and escapes from private hatcheries. The creek is one of the few streams in Pennsylvania that supports a wild rainbow trout population. Acid rain once adversely impacted the native brook trout population in the creek, but they have made a comeback.

Mayflies have been observed on Bowman Creek during the summer months. Ospreys are sometimes seen flying over the creek.

A feature known as the Bowman Creek Ledges is located along Bowman Creek in Eaton Township, Wyoming County. It is listed as a high-rank site on the Wyoming County Natural Areas Inventory. A northeastern hardwood forest with high levels of biodiversity occurs on the ledges. The canopy is dense and contains trees of varying ages. It mainly consists of beech, hemlock, sugar maple, and yellow birch. In the shrub layer, there is witch-hazel and striped maple. Numerous ferns and wildflowers also occur at the site, including Christmas fern, maidenhair fern, marginal wood fern, columbine, wild geranium, and wild ginger, as well as numerous other wildflower species.

== Recreation ==
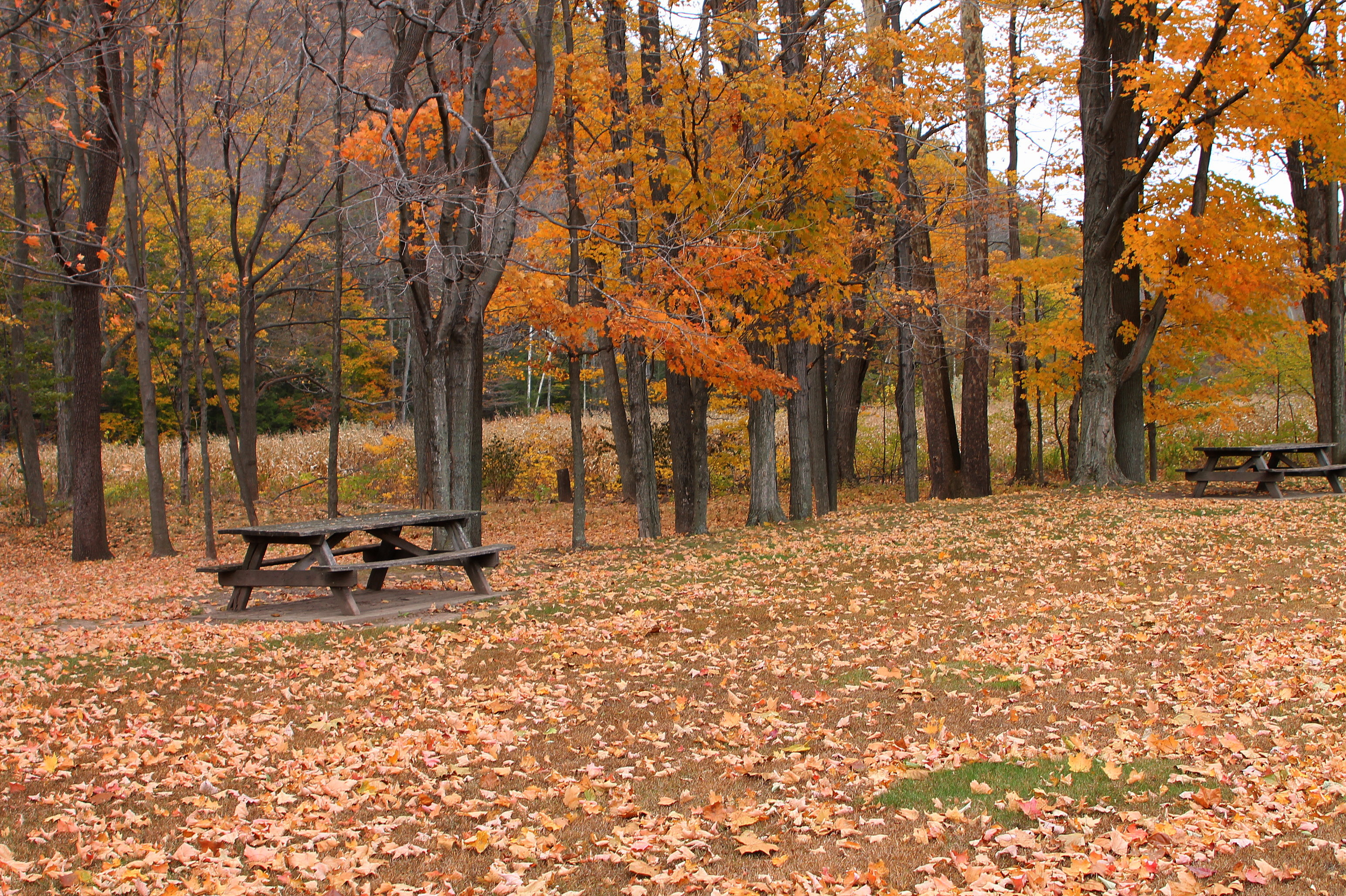
Park on Bowman Creek

It is possible to canoe on 10.3 miles (16.6 km) of Bowman Creek during snowmelt and within four days of heavy rain. The difficulty rating of the creek ranges from 1 to 2. Edward Gertler describes the scenery along it as "fair to good" in his book Keystone Canoeing.

Catch and release fly fishing is the only form of fishing permitted on a 0.8-mile (1.3 km) stretch of Bowman Creek between Pennsylvania Route 292 and the tributary Marsh Creek. The creek is highly popular among anglers from the vicinity of Wilkes-Barre and Scranton.

Bowman Creek has been described as "one of northeastern Pennsylvania's top trout streams", "a fisherman's stream", and its trout have been described as "legendary in northeastern Pennsylvania". The creek has a substantial history of angling.

The upper reaches of Bowman Creek are in Ricketts Glen State Park. The creek also flows through Pennsylvania State Game Lands Number 57. A tract of land at the creek's headwaters is owned by the Pennsylvania Fish and Boat Commission. Legal hunting and trapping is permitted on Commission property unless otherwise posted. The road alongside the creek near its headwaters is a joint-use road, with car traffic, snowmobiles, and hikers permitted on it.

As of the time that the Wyoming County Natural Areas Inventory was published, there was a park in the vicinity of Bowman Creek and the Bowman Creek Ledges. According to the Wyoming County Natural Areas Inventory, this location is "very scenic". However, the ledges themselves only experience slight disturbances.

== Gallery ==
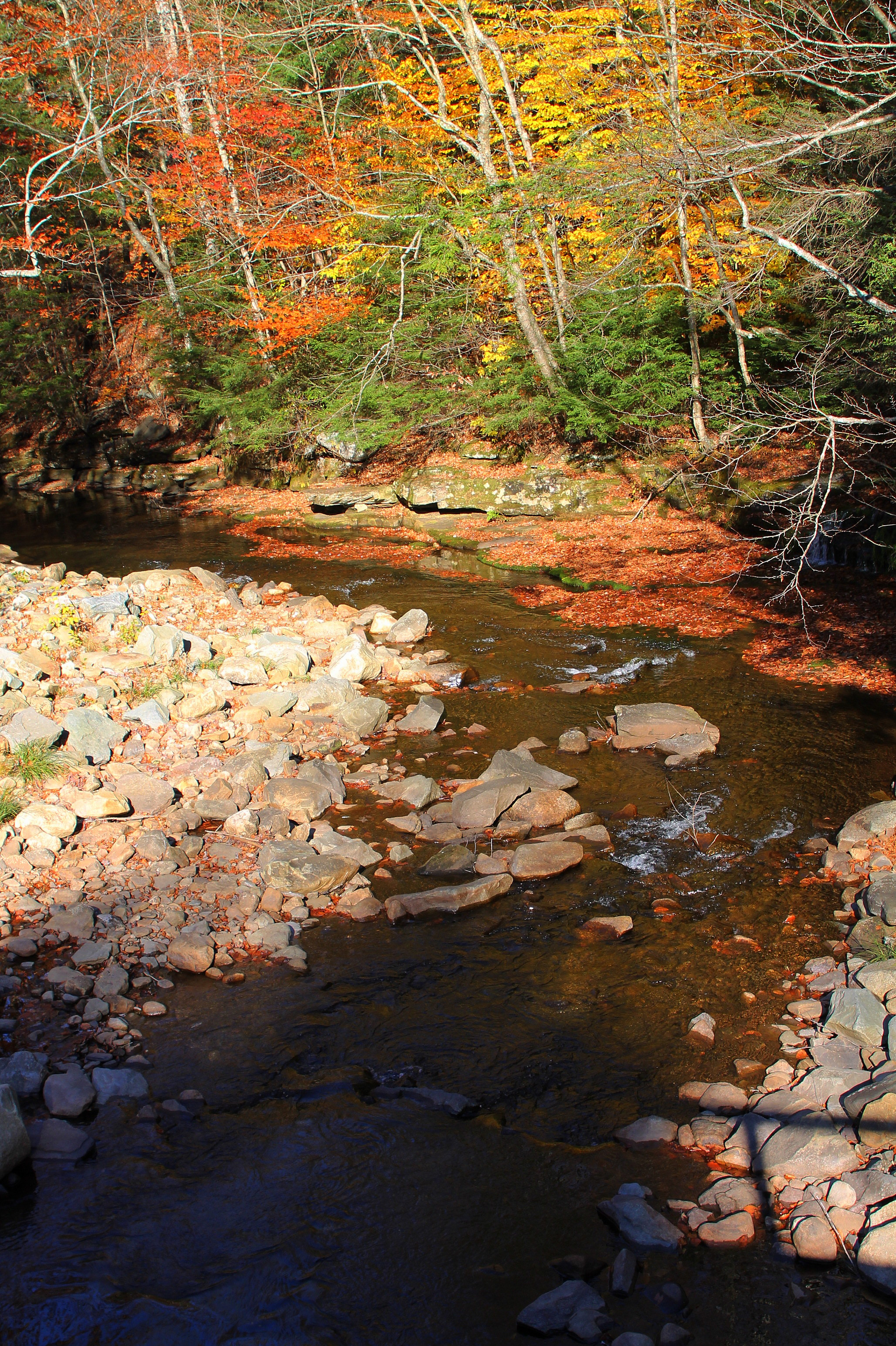
At the confluence of the tributary Beth Run

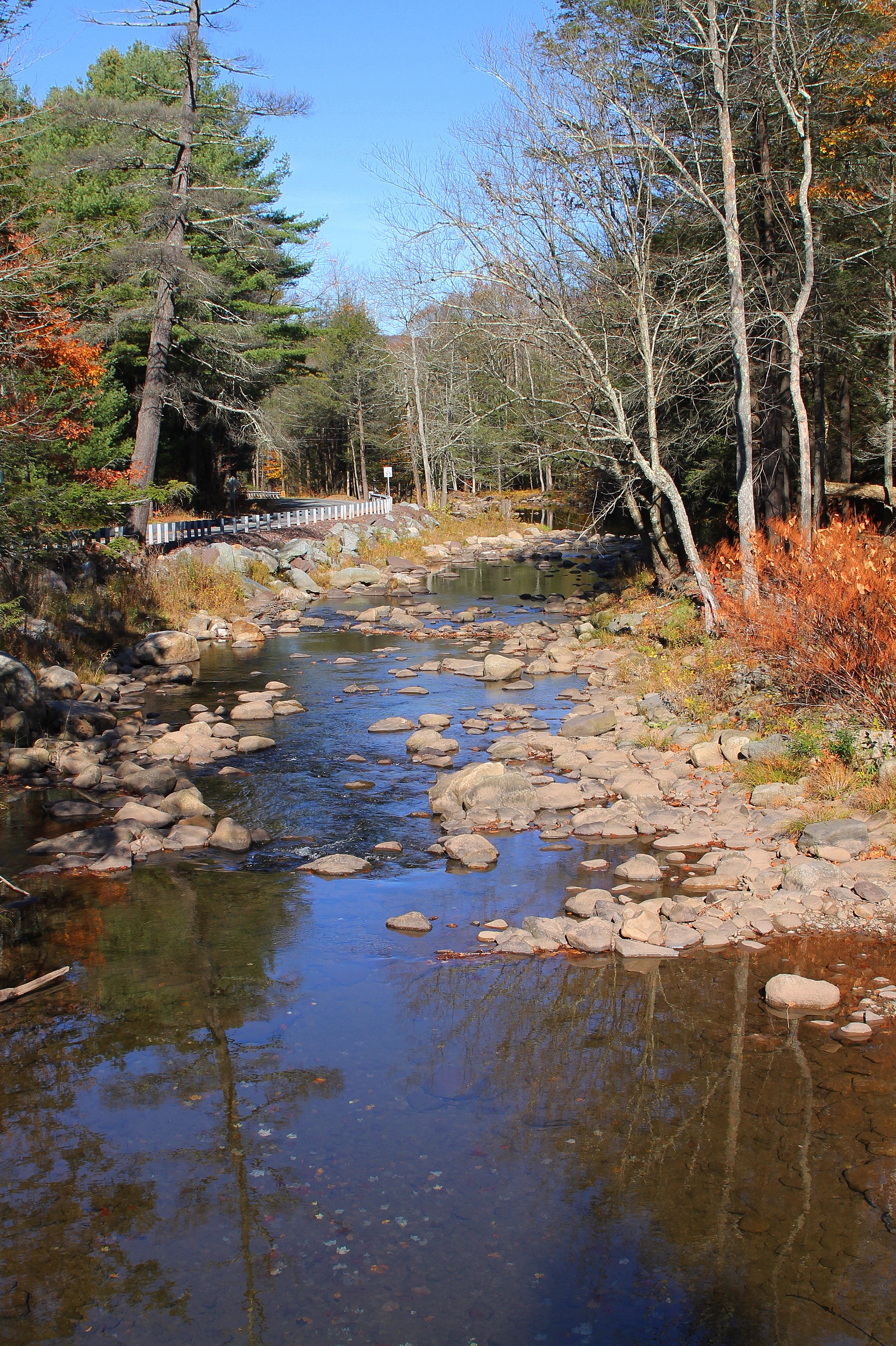
West of Noxen

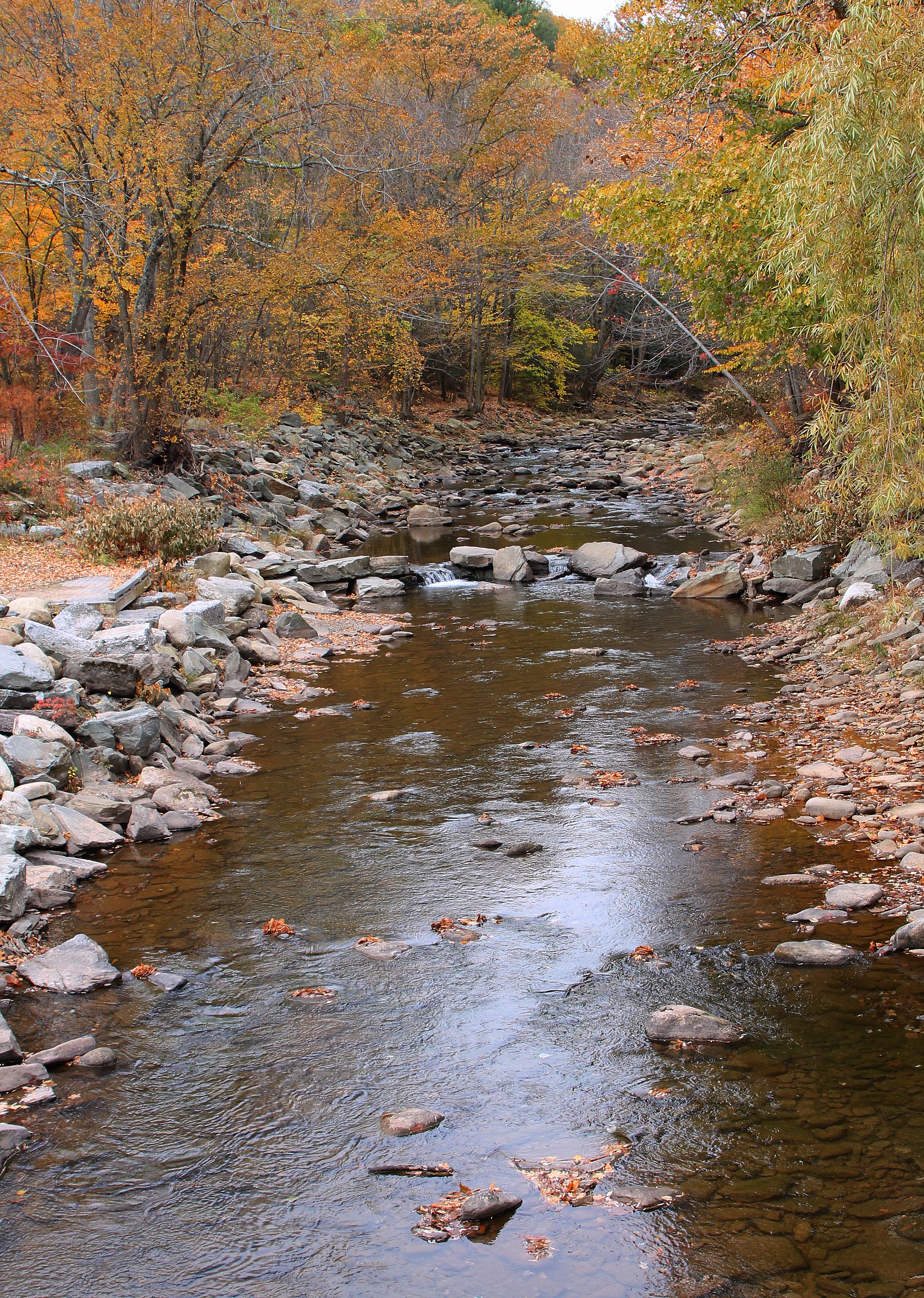
In Noxen

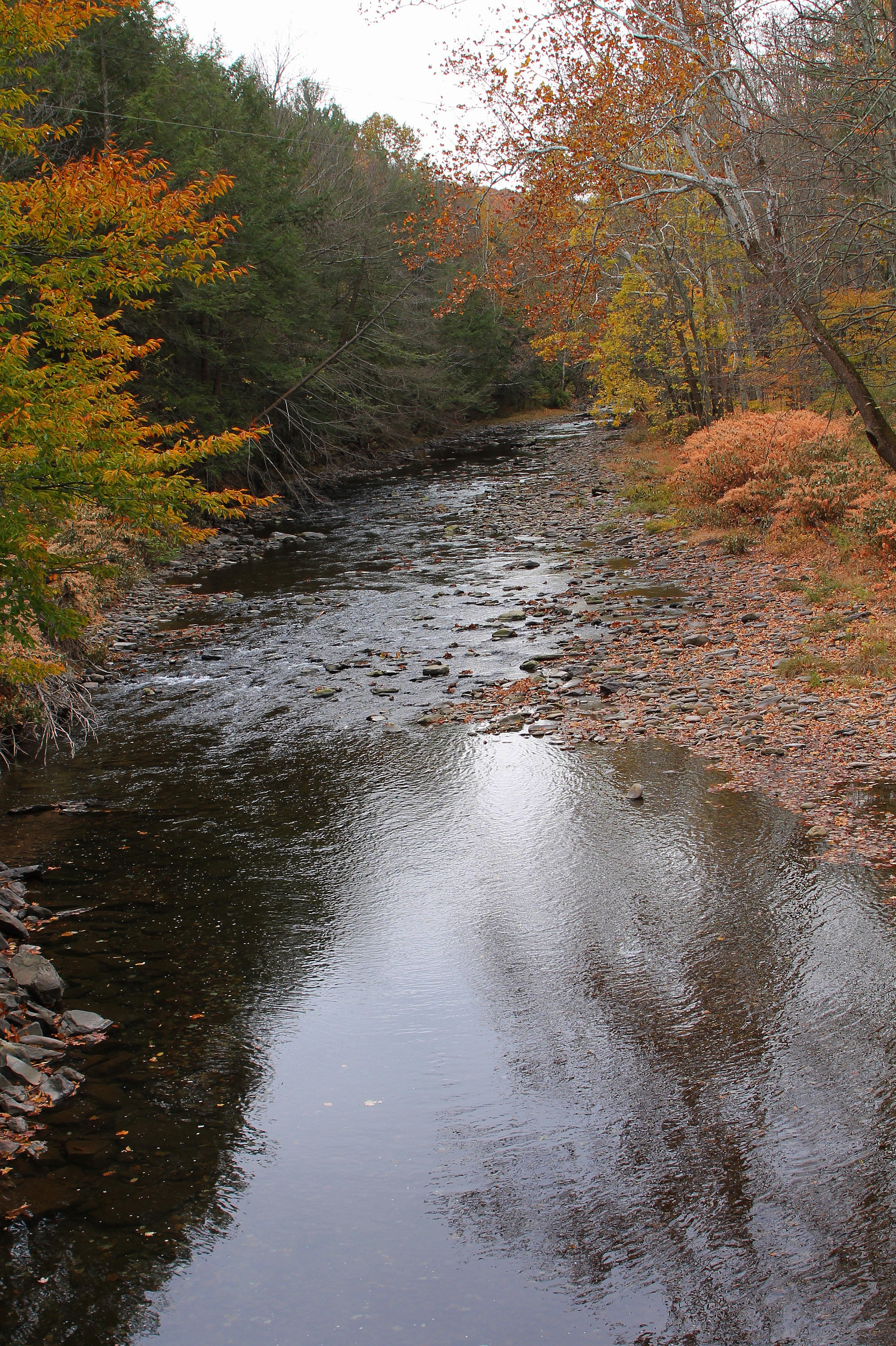
From Pennsylvania Route 292

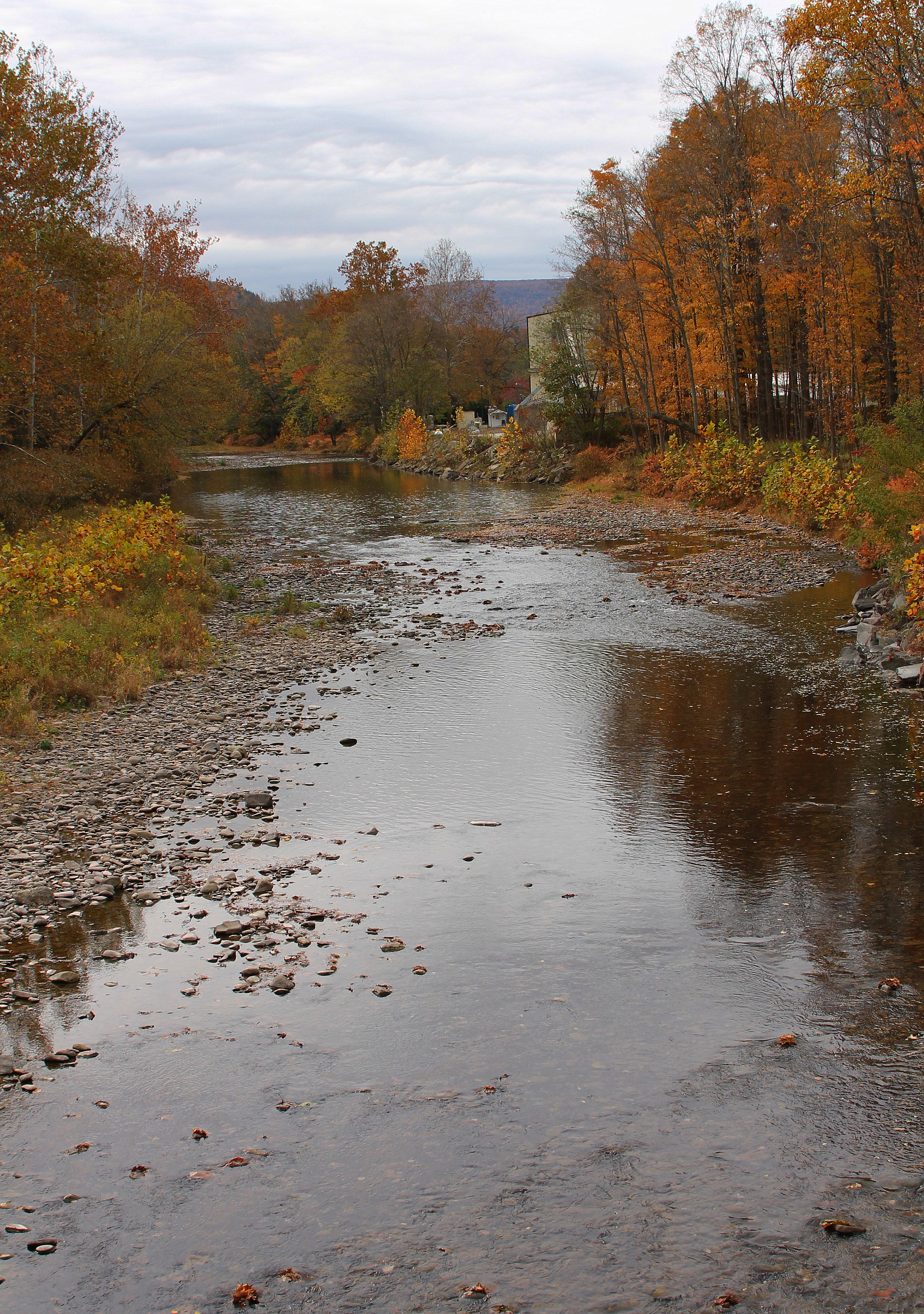
Near its mouth

== See also ==
- Jackson Creek (Susquehanna River), next tributary of the Susquehanna River going downriver
- Tunkhannock Creek (Susquehanna River), next tributary of the Susquehanna River going upriver
- List of rivers of Pennsylvania
- List of tributaries of Bowman Creek
