= Sorber Run =

River in Pennsylvania, United States

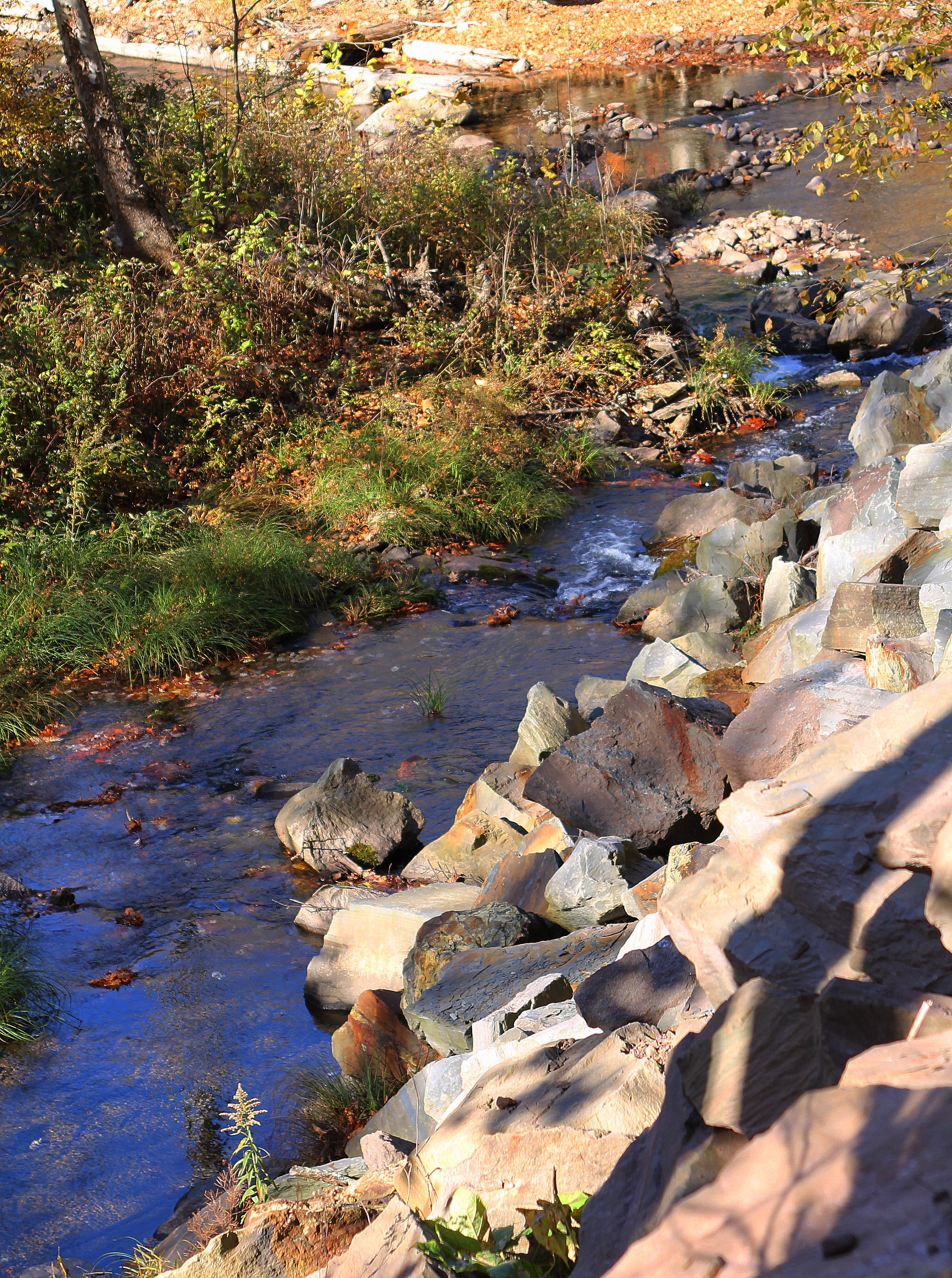
- Sorber Run looking downstream near its mouth

Physical characteristics
- Source
  - location: valley on a mountain in Lake Township, Luzerne County, Pennsylvania
  - elevation: between 1,940 and 1,960 feet (591 and 597 m)
- Mouth
  - location: Bowman Creek in Noxen Township, Pennsylvania
  - coordinates: 41°24′34″N 76°05′37″W
  - elevation: 1,142 ft (348 m)
- Length: 3.1 mi (5.0 km)
- Basin size: 2.08 mi^{2} (5.4 km^{2})

Basin features
- Progression: Bowman Creek → Susquehanna River → Chesapeake Bay

Sorber Run is a tributary of Bowman Creek in Luzerne County and Wyoming County, in Pennsylvania, in the United States. It is approximately 3.1 miles (5.0 km) long and flows through Lake Township in Luzerne County and Noxen Township in Wyoming County. The watershed of the stream has an area of 2.08 square miles (5.4 km^{2}). The surficial geology in the stream's vicinity consists of alluvium and Wisconsinan Till. The watershed is designated as Exceptional Value waters and a Migratory Fishery. The stream is one of two Wilderness Trout Streams in Wyoming County.

== Course ==
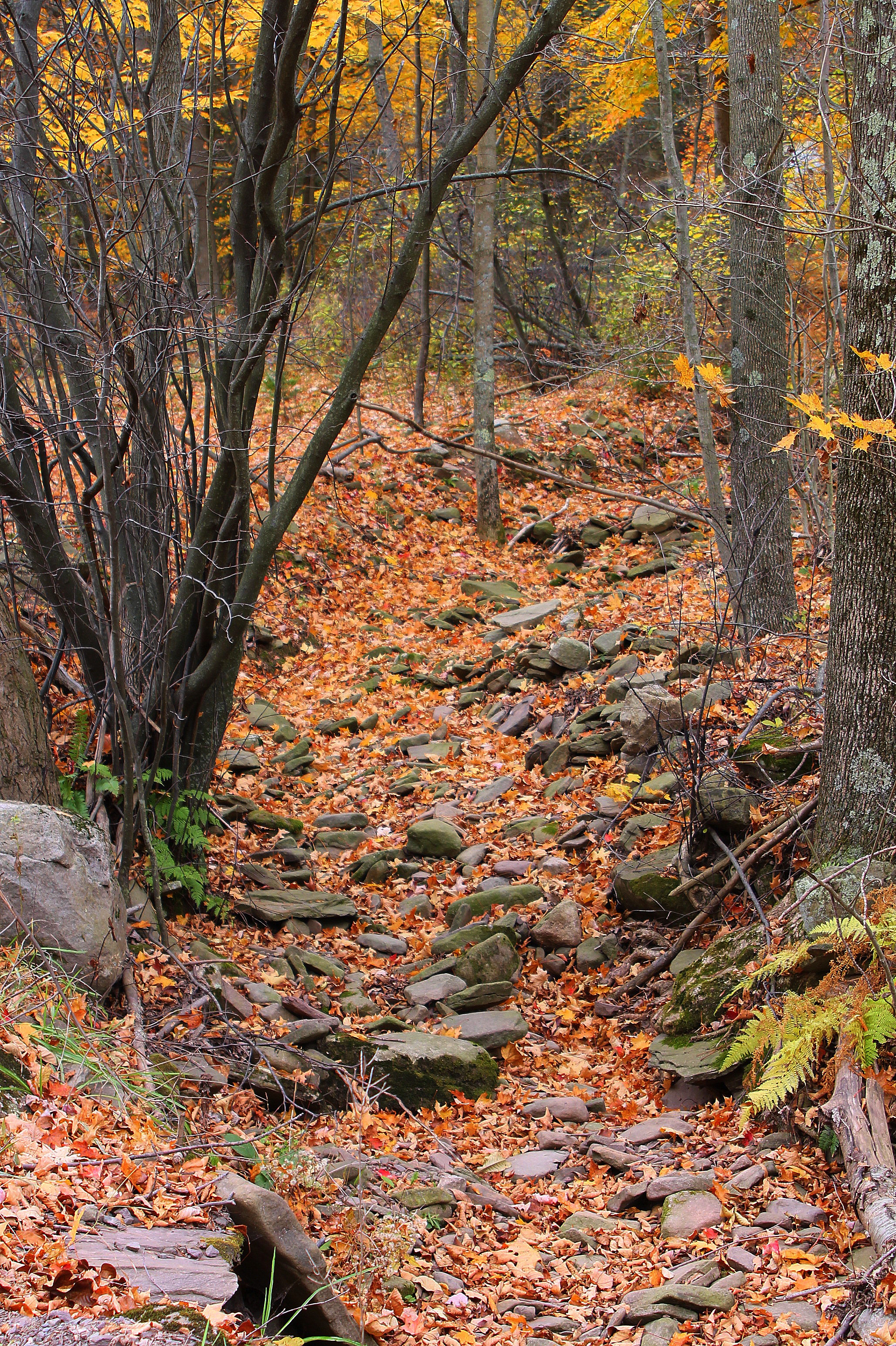
Sorber Run looking upstream in its upper reaches

Sorber Run begins in a valley on a mountain in Lake Township, Luzerne County. It flows east-northeast for a few tenths of a mile before turning northeast for a short distance. The stream then turns north for several tenths of a mile, flowing through a valley to the west of Sorber Mountain. It then exits Lake Township, Luzerne County and enters Noxen Township, Wyoming County. In this reach, the stream turns north-northwest for some distance before turning north. After a while, it turns north-northwest, leaves its valley, and turns north, reaching its confluence with Bowman Creek.

Sorber Run joins Bowman Creek 16.25 miles (26.15 km) upstream of its mouth.

== Geography and geology ==
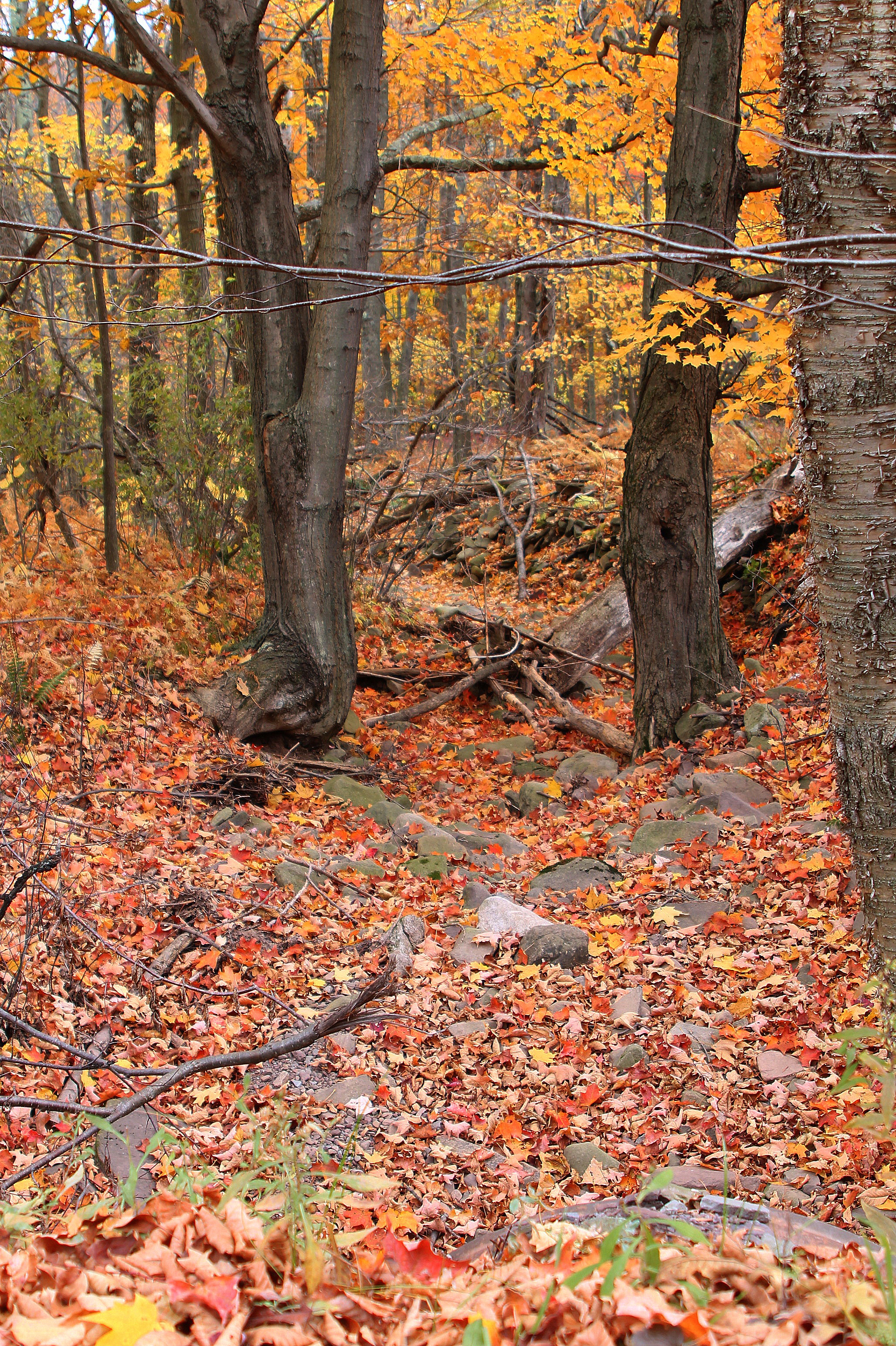
Sorber Run looking downstream in its upper reaches

The elevation near the mouth of Sorber Run is 1,142 feet (348 m) above sea level. The elevation of the stream's source is between 1,940 and 1,960 feet (591 and 597 m) above sea level.

For most of the length of Sorber Run, the surficial geology immediately next to it consists of alluvium. However, the surficial geology of alluvium does not extend very far from the stream before being replaced by a till known as Wisconsinan Till. In the stream's upper reaches, the surficial geology consists of Wisconsinan till.

During the Ice Age, when the receding glacier in the valley of Bowman Creek reached the mouth of Sorber Run, the lower outlets of Glacial Lake Bowman opened. Sorber Run is classified as a High-gradient Clearwater Creek.

== Watershed ==
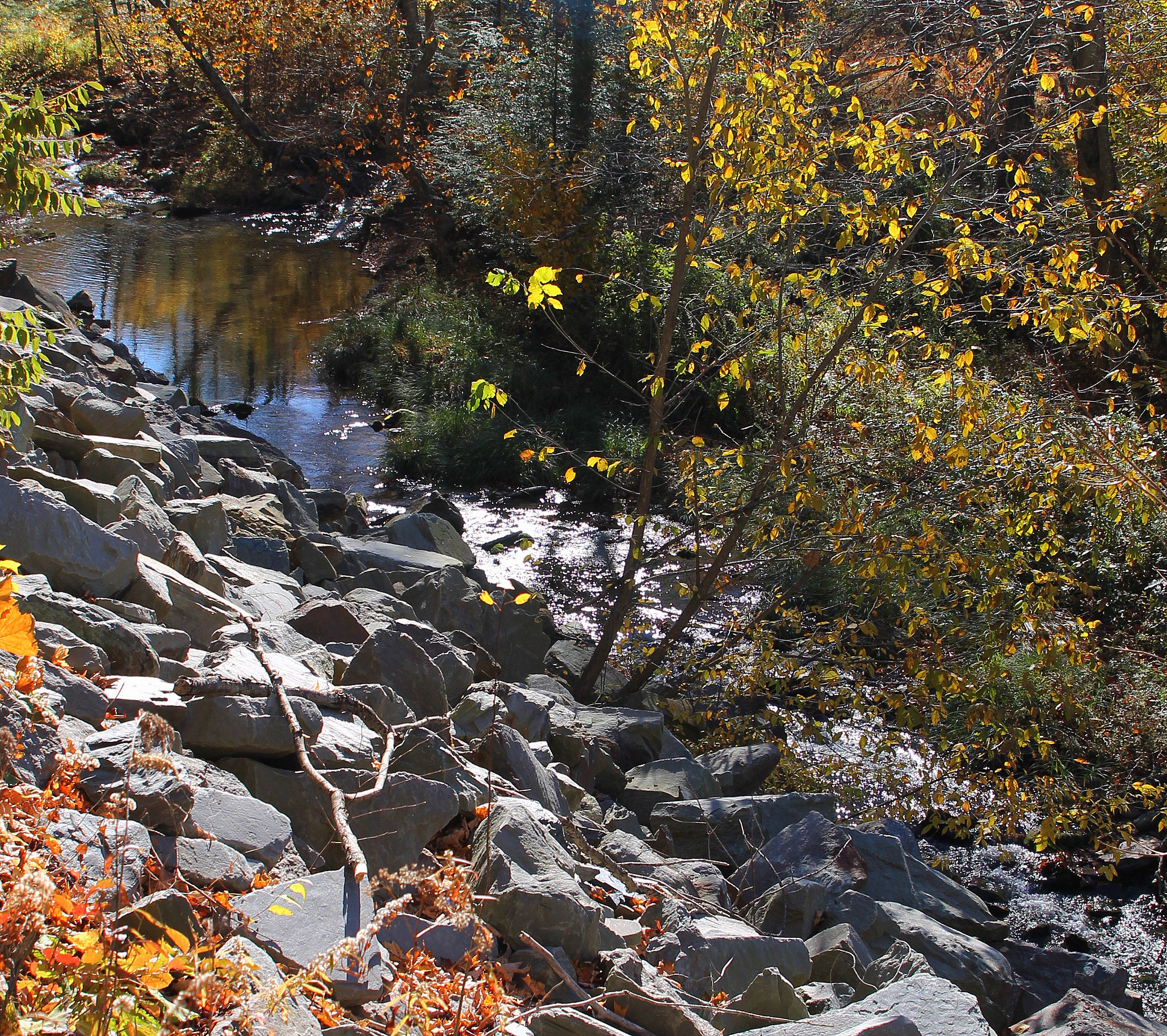
Sorber Run looking upstream near its mouth

The watershed of Sorber Run has an area of 2.08 square miles (5.4 km^{2}). The stream is entirely within the United States Geological Survey quadrangle of Noxen.

Most of the length of Sorber Run is located within Pennsylvania State Game Lands Number 57.

== History ==
Sorber Run was entered into the Geographic Names Information System on August 2, 1979. Its identifier in the Geographic Names Information System is 1199562.

In 2005, the Pennsylvania Fish and Boat Commission considered adding Sorber Run to its list of Class A Wild Trout Waters.

== Biology ==
The drainage basin of Sorber Run is designated as Exceptional Value waters and a Migratory Fishery. Wild trout naturally reproduce in the stream from its headwaters downstream to its mouth. It is classified by the Pennsylvania Fish and Boat Commission as a Wilderness Trout Stream for wild brook trout from its headwaters downstream to its mouth. This makes it one of two Wilderness Trout Streams in Wyoming County, the other being Cider Run.

When Sorber Run was surveyed by the Pennsylvania Fish and Boat Commission in 2002, it was given a biomass class of A. The biomass of trout was more than 45 kilograms per hectare (40 lb/acre).

Sorber Run is listed on the Wyoming County Natural Areas Inventory. It was once designated as Class A Wild Trout Waters` for brook trout.

== See also ==
- Stone Run (Bowman Creek), next tributary of Bowman Creek going downstream
- Baker Run, next tributary of Bowman Creek going upstream
- List of rivers of Pennsylvania
- List of tributaries of Bowman Creek
