= Wolf Run (Bowman Creek tributary) =

Physical characteristics
- Source
  - location: valley near the edge of a plateau in Ross Township, Luzerne County, Pennsylvania
  - elevation: just over 2,140 feet (650 m)
- Mouth
  - location: Bowman Creek at Mountain Springs in Ross Township, Luzerne County, Pennsylvania
  - coordinates: 41°21′05″N 76°11′42″W
  - elevation: 1,736 ft (529 m)
- Length: 0.9 mi (1.4 km)
- Basin size: 0.74 sq mi (1.9 km^{2})

Basin features
- Progression: Bowman Creek → Susquehanna River → Chesapeake Bay

Wolf Run is a tributary of Bowman Creek in Luzerne County, Pennsylvania, in the United States. It is approximately 0.9 miles (1.4 km) long and flows through Ross Township. The watershed of the stream has an area of 0.74 square miles (1.9 km^{2}). The surficial geology in its vicinity consists of Wisconsinan Till, alluvium, alluvial fan, and bedrock. There are a series of wetlands at the stream's headwaters. These wetlands are listed on the Luzerne County Natural Areas Inventory. The drainage basin of the stream is designated as a High-Quality Coldwater Fishery and a Migratory Fishery.

== Course ==
Wolf Run begins in a valley near the edge of a plateau in Ross Township. It flows south-southwest for several hundred feet before turning south-southeast and flowing down a slope. After a few tenths of a mile, the stream turns south for a few tenths of a mile before reaching the base of the slope. It then reaches its confluence with Bowman Creek.

Wolf Run joins Bowman Creek 24.04 miles (38.69 km) upstream of its mouth.

== Geography and geology ==
The elevation near the mouth of Wolf Run is 1,736 feet (529 m) above sea level. The elevation of the stream's source is just over 2,140 feet (650 m) above sea level.

The surficial geology near the mouth of Wolf Run consists of alluvium and alluvial fan, which both contain stratified sand, silt, and gravel, as well as some boulders. Further upstream, the surficial geology consists of a till known as Wisconsinan Till. At the headwaters, the surficial geology features bedrock containing sandstone and shale.

== Watershed ==
The watershed of Wolf Run has an area of 0.74 square miles (1.9 km^{2}). The stream is entirely within the United States Geological Survey quadrangle of Sweet Valley. Its mouth is located at Mountain Springs.

There are several hydrologically connected wetlands at the headwaters of Wolf Run.

== History and recreation ==
Wolf Run was entered into the Geographic Names Information System on August 2, 1979. Its identifier in the Geographic Names Information System is 1191676.

Wolf Run was historically used as a water supply for the Lehigh Valley Railroad.

At least part of Wolf Run is in Pennsylvania State Game Lands Number 57 and a hiking trail is located relatively close by.

== Biology ==
The drainage basin of Wolf Run is designated as a High-Quality Coldwater Fishery and a Migratory Fishery. Wild trout naturally reproduce in the stream from its headwaters downstream to its mouth.

The wetlands at the headwaters of Wolf Run are listed on the Luzerne County Natural Areas Inventory. The center of the wetlands is relatively open and they are bordered by shrubs. Major plant species at the site include cinnamon fern, highbush blueberry, cotton grass, soft rush, woolgrass, groundberry, huckleberry, cranberry, and swamp candles. Other major species include the sedgees Carex stricta, Carex rustrata, and Carex folliculata, mosses, and red spruce. Two animal species of concern have been observed at the site.

There are no serious disturbances at wetlands at the headwaters of Wolf Run. A trail passes close to the wetlands, but there is little sign of the wetlands being trampled by hikers. Deer browsing is also a possible threat to the area, but no impacts have been observed. Logging and hydrological changes are also possible threats to the site.

== See also ==
- Beth Run, next tributary of Bowman Creek going downstream
- Bean Run, next tributary of Bowman Creek going upstream
- List of rivers of Pennsylvania
- List of tributaries of Bowman Creek
