= Beth Run =

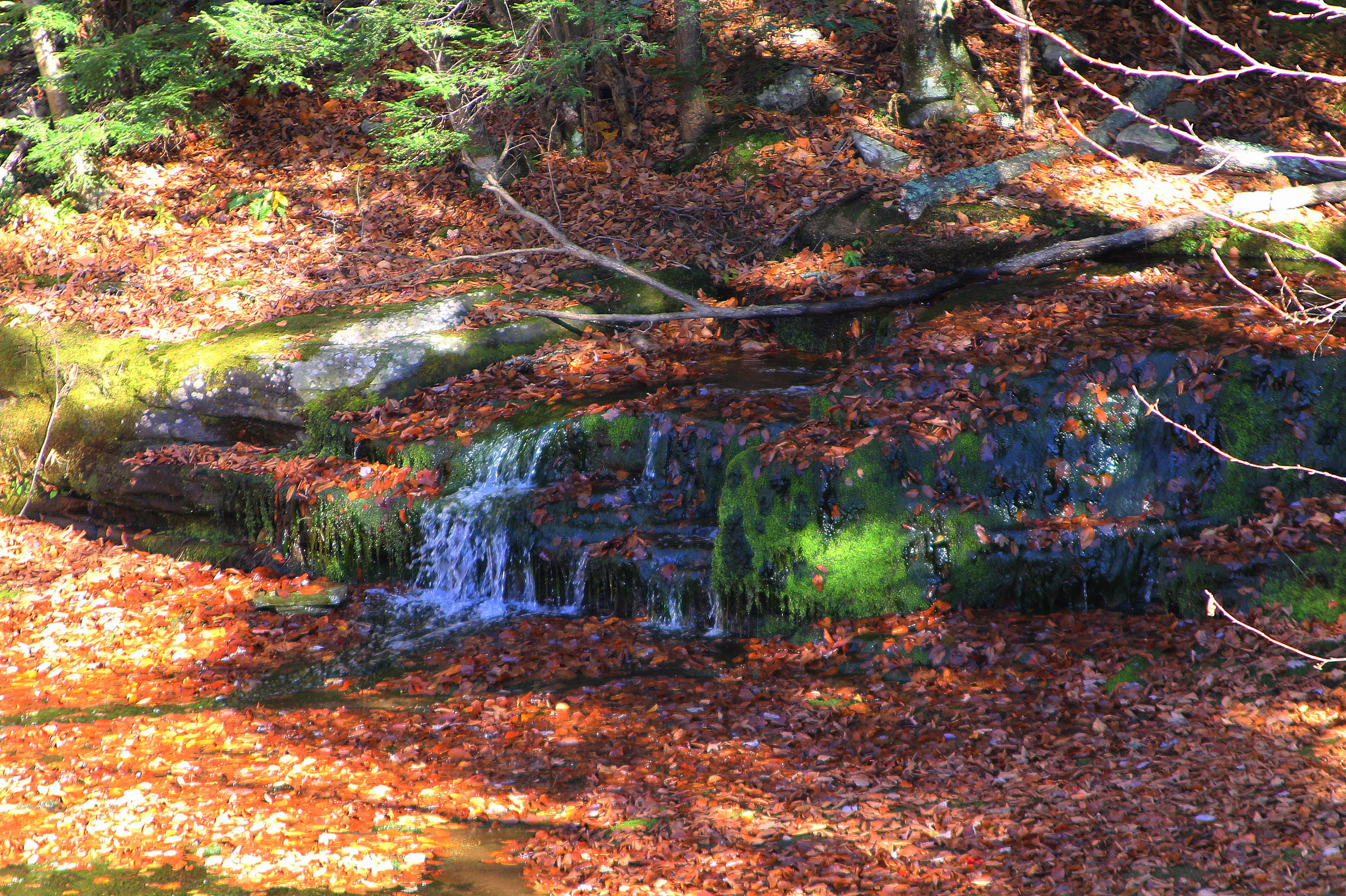
- Mouth of Beth Run

Physical characteristics
- Source
  - location: head of a valley in Ross Township, Luzerne County, Pennsylvania
  - elevation: between 1,980 and 2,000 feet (604 and 610 m)
- Mouth
  - location: Bowman Creek near Mountain Springs in Lake Township, Luzerne County, Pennsylvania
  - coordinates: 41°21′38″N 76°09′49″W
  - elevation: 1,598 ft (487 m)
- Length: 1.9 mi (3.1 km)
- Basin size: 2.34 mi^{2} (6.1 km^{2})

Basin features
- Progression: Bowman Creek → Susquehanna River → Chesapeake Bay
- Tributaries
  - right: one unnamed tributary

Beth Run is a tributary of Bowman Creek in Luzerne County, Pennsylvania, in the United States. It is approximately 1.9 miles (3.1 km) long and flows through Ross Township and Lake Township. The watershed of the stream has an area of 2.34 square miles (6.1 km^{2}). The surficial geology along it consists of Wisconsinan Till and alluvium. The stream's watershed is designated as a High-Quality Coldwater Fishery and a Migratory Fishery and the stream is Class A Wild Trout Waters.

== Course ==
Beth Run begins at the head of a valley in Ross Township. It flows east-northeast for several tenths of a mile before turning northeast for several tenths of a mile and entering Lake Township. Here, the stream receives an unnamed tributary from the right and turns north for several tenths of a mile, its valley widening considerably. At the end of the valley, the stream reaches its confluence with Bowman Creek.

Beth Run joins Bowman Creek 21.97 miles (35.36 km) upstream of its mouth.

== Hydrology ==
The concentration of alkalinity in Beth Run is 5 milligrams per liter (0.0050 oz/cu ft).

== Geography and geology ==
The elevation near the mouth of Beth Run is 1,598 feet (487 m) above sea level. The elevation of the stream's source between 1,980 and 2,000 feet (604 and 610 m) above sea level.

The surficial geology along most of the length of Beth Run consists of a till known as Wisconsinan Till. In the stream's upper reaches, alluvium is present as well and some of the Wisconsinan Till is underlain by glacial lake clays. There is also a patch of Wisconsinan Bouldery Till at the headwaters; it is rich in boulders. The surficial geology along the sides of the stream's valley includes bedrock consisting of sandstone and shale.

== Watershed ==
The watershed of Beth Run has an area of 2.34 square miles (6.1 km^{2}). The stream is entirely within the United States Geological Survey quadrangle of Sweet Valley.

The entire length of Beth Run is on public land that is open to access.

== History ==
Beth Run was entered into the Geographic Names Information System on August 2, 1979. Its identifier in the Geographic Names Information System is 1169332.

In the 1970s, the Pennsylvania Game Commission was attempting to purchase a 3,200-acre (1,300 ha) tract of land in the vicinity of Beth Run to add to Pennsylvania State Game Lands Number 57. The Pennsylvania Game Commission also once requested a permit to construct an aluminum box culvert bridge over the stream with the purpose of providing access to the southern parts of Pennsylvania State Game Lands Number 57 for tree salvage cutting.

== Biology ==
The drainage basin of Beth Run is designated as a High-Quality Coldwater Fishery and a Migratory Fishery. Wild trout naturally reproduce in the stream from its headwaters downstream to its mouth. It is classified by the Pennsylvania Fish and Boat Commission as Class A Wild Trout Waters for brook trout from its headwaters downstream to its mouth.

== See also ==
- Butternut Run, next tributary of Bowman Creek going downstream
- Wolf Run (Bowman Creek), next tributary of Bowman Creek going upstream
- List of rivers of Pennsylvania
- List of tributaries of Bowman Creek
