= Butternut Run =

Physical characteristics
- Source
  - location: head of a valley on Kocher Mountain in Lake Township, Luzerne County, Pennsylvania
  - elevation: between 2,060 and 2,080 feet (628 and 634 m)
- Mouth
  - location: Bowman Creek near Mountain Springs in Lake Township, Luzerne County, Pennsylvania
  - coordinates: 41°22′24″N 76°08′55″W
  - elevation: 1,440 ft (440 m)
- Length: 1.5 mi (2.4 km)
- Basin size: 1.30 mi^{2} (3.4 km^{2})

Basin features
- Progression: Bowman Creek → Susquehanna River → Chesapeake Bay
- Tributaries
  - left: one unnamed tributary
  - right: one unnamed tributary

Butternut Run is a tributary of Bowman Creek in Luzerne County, Pennsylvania, in the United States. It is approximately 1.5 miles (2.4 km) long and flows through Lake Township. The watershed of the stream has an area of 1.30 square miles (3.4 km^{2}). The surficial geology along the stream consists of Wisconsinan Till. Its drainage basin is designated as a High-Quality Coldwater Fishery and a Migratory Fishery and the stream is Class A Wild Trout Waters.

== Course ==
Butternut Run begins at the head of a valley on Kocher Mountain in Lake Township. It flows north through the valley for several tenths of a mile, receiving two short, unnamed tributaries (one from the left and one from the right). The stream then turns northwest for several tenths of a mile before turning north for several hundred feet. After this, it turns northeast, leaving its valley. A short distance further downstream, it reaches its confluence with Bowman Creek.

Butternut Run joins Bowman Creek 20.62 miles (33.18 km) upstream of its mouth.

== Hydrology ==
The concentration of alkalinity in Butternut Run is 6 milligrams per liter (0.0060 oz/cu ft).

== Geography and geology ==
The elevation near the mouth of Butternut Run is 1,440 feet (440 m) above sea level. The elevation of the stream's source is between 2,060 and 2,080 feet (628 and 634 m) above sea level.

The surficial geology along the length of Butternut Run features a till known as Wisconsinan Till. In the streams lower reaches, this is underlain by glacial lake clays. The stream's valley walls and the area surrounding the valley has surficial geology featuring bedrock consisting of sandstone and shale.

== Watershed ==
The watershed of Butternut Run has an area of 1.30 square miles (3.4 km^{2}). The stream is entirely within the United States Geological Survey quadrangle of Sweet Valley. Its mouth is located near Mountain Springs.

The entire length of Butternut Run is on private land that is closed to access.

== History ==
Butternut Run was entered into the Geographic Names Information System on August 2, 1979. Its identifier in the Geographic Names Information System is 1170818.

== Biology ==
The drainage basin of Butternut Run is designated as a High-Quality Coldwater Fishery and a Migratory Fishery. Wild trout naturally reproduce in the stream from its headwaters downstream to its mouth. It is classified by the Pennsylvania Fish and Boat Commission as Class A Wild Trout Waters for brook trout from its headwaters downstream to its mouth.

== See also ==
- Cider Run (Bowman Creek), next tributary of Bowman Creek going downstream
- Beth Run, next tributary of Bowman Creek going upstream
- List of rivers of Pennsylvania
- List of tributaries of Bowman Creek
