= Stull, Pennsylvania =

- Populated place
- Location of Stull in Pennsylvania Stull, Pennsylvania (the United States)
- Coordinates: 41°25′02″N 76°05′30″W
- Country: United States
- State: Pennsylvania
- County: Wyoming
- Elevation: 1,168 ft (356 m)
- Time zone: UTC-5 (Eastern (EST))
  - Summer (DST): UTC-4 (EDT)
- Area code: 570
- FIPS code: 42-74920
- GNIS feature ID: 1204762

Stull is a census-designated place located in Noxen Township, Pennsylvania.

== Geography ==
Stull appears on the Noxen U.S. Geological Survey Map. It has an estimated elevation of 591 feet (180 m) above sea level. It was originally built to house workers for the sawmill located there.

== History ==
Stull once had a post office, school, store and church and once had as many as 500 residents. The mill burned down in 1902, was rebuilt, but then was again closed for a last time in 1906. The local school closed in 1912. After the closing of the sawmill, Stull shifted from lumber to agricultural production and during World War I, the remains of the sawmill were scrapped for the war effort. Today, there are a few houses and residents
