= Groundberry =

Groundberry may refer to:

- Gaultheria procumbens
- Rubus hispidus
