= Noxen Township, Pennsylvania =

Township in Pennsylvania, US

Noxen Township
- Township
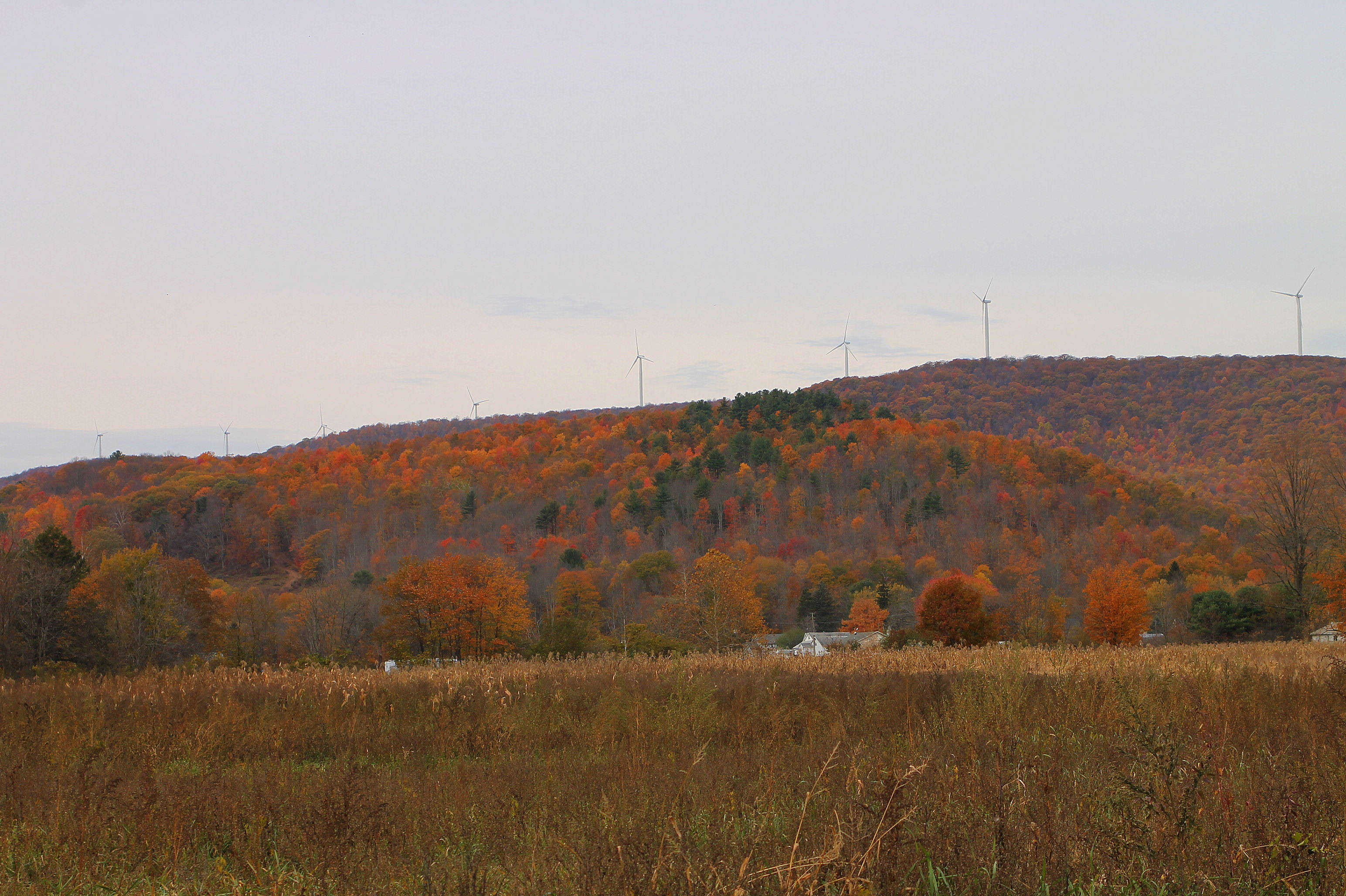
- Scenery of Noxen Township

- Location of Pennsylvania in the United States
- Coordinates: 41°25′00″N 76°04′59″W
- Country: United States
- State: Pennsylvania
- County: Wyoming
- Founded: 1895

Area
  - Total: 28.75 sq mi (74.45 km^{2})
  - Land: 28.71 sq mi (74.37 km^{2})
  - Water: 0.031 sq mi (0.08 km^{2})
- Elevation: 1,611 ft (491 m)

Population (2020)
  - Total: 919
  - Estimate (2021): 916
  - Density: 29.8/sq mi (11.51/km^{2})
- Time zone: UTC-5 (EST)
  - Summer (DST): UTC-4 (EDT)
- ZIP Code: 18636
- Area code: 570
- FIPS code: 42-131-55736
- Website: noxenpa.com

Noxen Township is a township that is located in Wyoming County, Pennsylvania, United States. The population was 919 at the time of the 2020 census.

== History ==
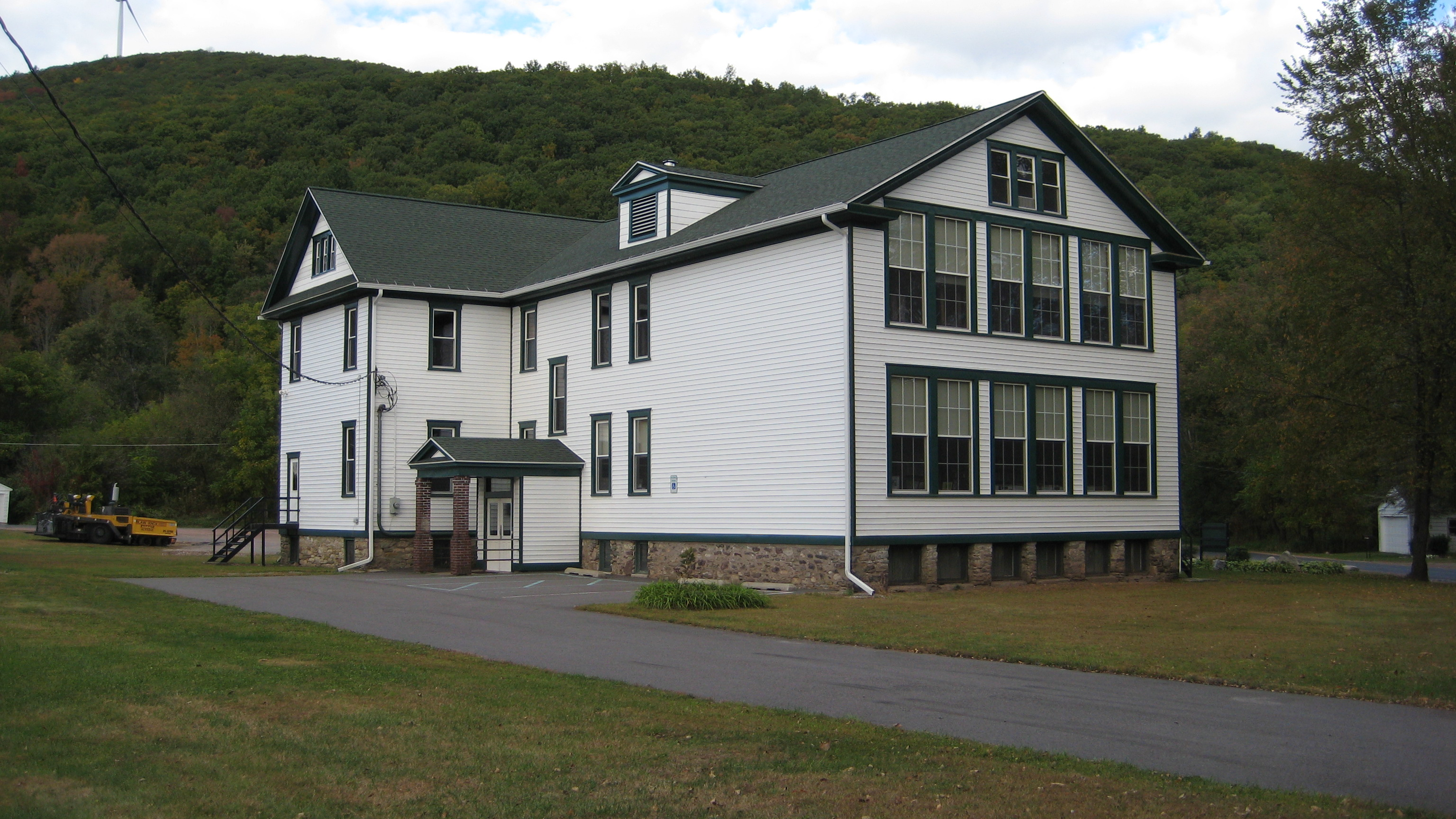
Noxen School in Noxen Township

The Noxen School was listed on the National Register of Historic Places in 2006.

== Geography ==
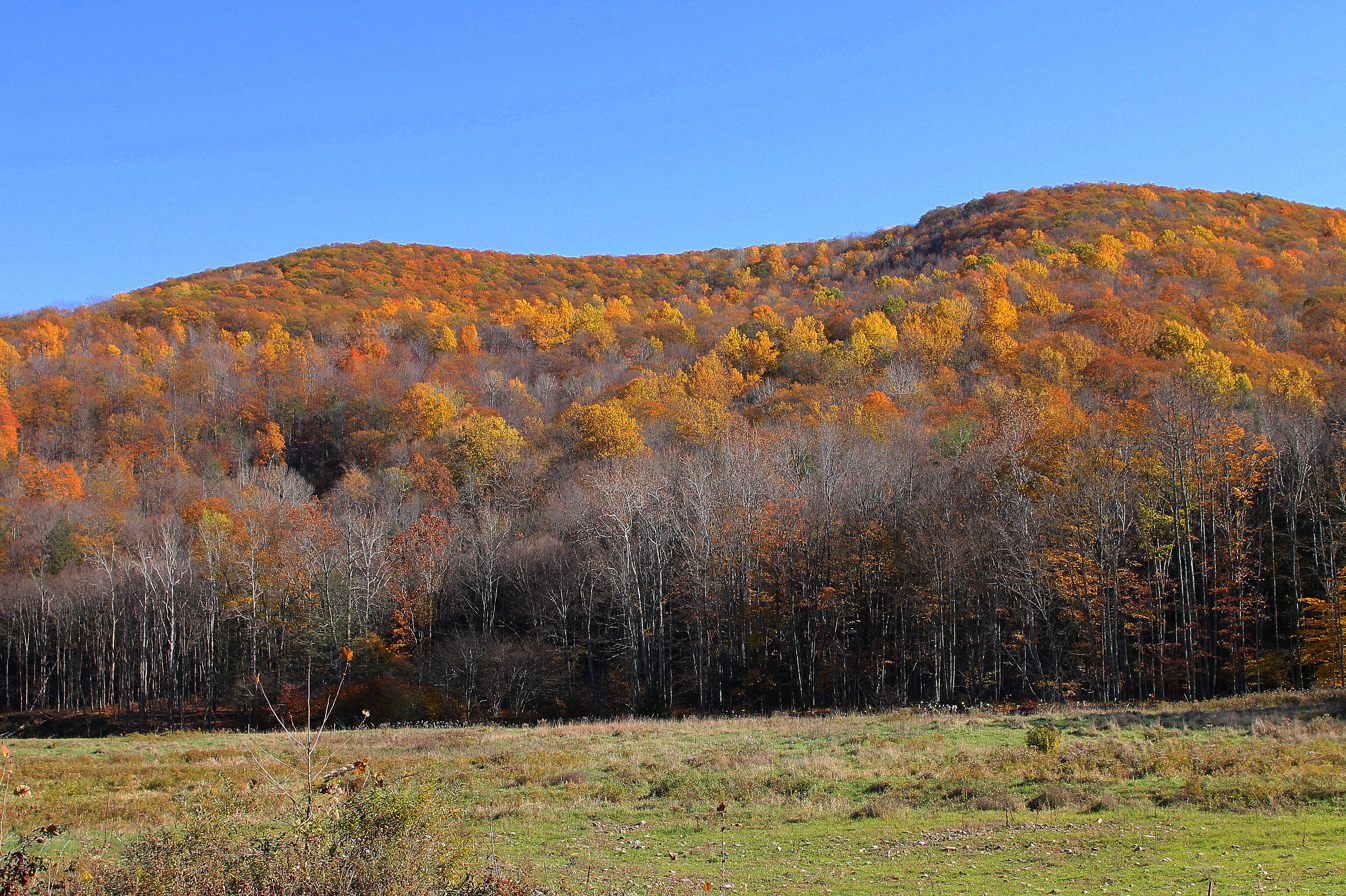
Mountain in fall, Noxen Township

According to the United States Census Bureau, the township has a total area of 28.73 square miles (74.4 km^{2}), of which 28.7 square miles (74 km^{2}) is land and 0.03 square mile (0.1 km^{2}) (0.1%) is water. It contains the census-designated place of Noxen.

== Demographics ==
Historical population
Census	Pop.	Note	%±
2010	902		—
2020	919		1.9%
2021 (est.)	916		−0.3%
U.S. Decennial Census

As of the census of 2010, there were 902 people, 363 households, and 237 families residing in the township.

The population density was 31.4 inhabitants per square mile (12.1/km^{2}). There were 427 housing units at an average density of 14.9/sq mi (5.8/km^{2}).

The racial makeup of the township was 98.8% White, 0.2% Native American, 0.1% from other races, and 0.9% from two or more races. Hispanic or Latino of any race were 0.3% of the population.

There were 363 households, out of which 33.6% had children under the age of eighteen living with them; 47.9% were married couples living together, 11.8% had a female householder with no husband present, and 34.7% were non-families. 28.1% of all households were made up of individuals, and 11.8% had someone living alone who was sixty-five years of age or older.

The average household size was 2.48 and the average family size was 3.03.

Within the township, the population was spread out, with 24.8% of residents who were under the age of eighteen, 58.9% who were aged eighteen to sixty-four, and 16.3% who were sixty-five years of age or older. The median age was 41.4 years.

The median income for a household in the township was $46,932, and the median income for a family was $50,455. Males had a median income of $39,375 compared with that of $24,125 for females.

The per capita income for the township was $20,386.

Approximately 5.8% of families and 9.2% of the population were living below the poverty line, including 19.9% of those who were under the age of eighteen. No residents who were aged sixty-five or older were reported as living in poverty.
