= Marsh (disambiguation) =

A marsh is a type of wetland.

Marsh may also refer to:

== Places ==
- Marsh, Buckinghamshire, England, a hamlet
- Marsh, Devon, a village in the Blackdown Hills, Devon, England
- Marsh, Huddersfield, West Yorkshire, England, a suburb of Huddersfield
- Marsh, the former name of Avon, Contra Costa County, California, United States
- Marsh Barton, Exeter, England
- Marsh Creek (disambiguation), United States
- Marsh Gibbon, Buckinghamshire, England
- Marsh Glacier, Ross Dependency, Antarctica
- Marsh Island (disambiguation)
- Marsh Lake (disambiguation)
- Marsh Lock, a lock and weir on the River Thames, England
- Marsh River (disambiguation)
- Marsh Township (disambiguation)

== Arts and entertainment ==
- The Marsh (2002 film)
- The Marsh (2006 film)
- The Marshes (2018 film)
- The Marsh, an American theater company in San Francisco, California
- "Marsh", a song by Eminem from the album Music to Be Murdered By

== Awards ==
- Marsh Award for Children's Literature in Translation
- Marsh Awards for Ornithology
- Marsh Biography Award, a British literary award

== Businesses ==
- Marsh (company), an insurance brokerage and risk management subsidiary of Marsh & McLennan Companies
- Marsh Aviation, an American aerospace company
- Marsh Engineering Company, which designed many bridges in the United States
- Marsh Hotel, Van Wert, Ohio, United States
- Marsh Motorcycle Company, defunct American motorcycle maker formed in 1905
- Marsh Railway, Schleswig-Holstein, Germany
- Marsh Supermarkets, a former American supermarket chain based in Indianapolis, Indiana
- Marsh & McLennan Companies, a global professional services firm

== People ==
- Marsh (surname)
- Marsh, stage name of British DJ and music producer Tom Marshall
- Marsh Darling (1919–2009), Canadian ice hockey player
- Marsh Giddings (1816–1875), American politician
- Marsh Ryman (1910–1992), American collegiate hockey coach and athletic director at the University of Minnesota

== Other uses ==
- USS Marsh (DE-699), a US Navy destroyer escort
- Marsh Chapel, on the campus of Boston University
- The Marsh Academy, a secondary school in New Romney, Kent, United Kingdom
- Marsh Racing, a team in the GRAND-AM Rolex Sports Car Series which formerly competed in the NASCAR Busch Series
- Marsh, a classification scheme for intestinal pathology in coeliac disease
- Marsh Mills, historic home in Maryland

== See also ==
- Marshe (disambiguation)
