= Marsh Creek =

Marsh Creek may refer to:

== Watercourses in the United States ==
- Marsh Creek (California), a tributary of the San Joaquin River
- Marsh Creek (Missouri), a tributary of the St. Francis River
- Marsh Creek (New York), Broome County, New York, United States
- Marsh Creek (Crabtree Creek tributary), a stream in North Carolina
- Marsh Creek (Bowman Creek tributary), Wyoming County, Pennsylvania
- Marsh Creek (Brandywine Creek), a tributary of Brandywine Creek in Pennsylvania
- Marsh Creek (Monocacy River tributary), a tributary of the Monocacy River in Pennsylvania
- Marsh Creek (Pine Creek tributary), a tributary of Pine Creek in Pennsylvania
- Marsh Creek (Rogers Creek tributary), Luzerne County, Pennsylvania, the United States
- Rogers Creek (Pennsylvania), also known as Marsh Creek, a tributary of Huntington Creek in Luzerne County
- Marsh Creek (Portneuf River), a tributary of the Portneuf River, Idaho

== Populated place ==
- Marsh Creek, Missouri, an unincorporated community

== See also ==
- Marsh (disambiguation)
- Marsh River (disambiguation)
