= Nuclear power in Pennsylvania =

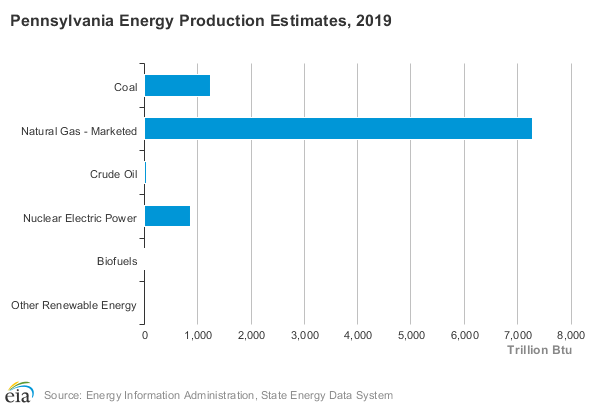
Graph of energy production in Pennsylvania from different sources

Nuclear power has been widely established in Pennsylvania since the 1950s and has grown to provide almost 25% of the energy produced in Pennsylvania. This is achieved through the four active reactors currently operating. There are five inactive reactors in Pennsylvania, including Three Mile Island, which had a partial meltdown and caused a reevaluation of nuclear reactor safety practices.

Nuclear power has a significant history in Pennsylvania, beginning in 1954 with the establishment of the first commercial, peace-time plant in America, the Shippingport Atomic Power Station. Since the construction of the Shippingport plant, 8 new nuclear plants have been constructed, 5 of which having already been decommissioned. Despite these shutdowns, in 2019 the 4 remaining active reactors in Pennsylvania collectively ranked second in the nation in electricity generation from nuclear energy, producing approximately 255 million MWh.

== History ==
The start of nuclear power in Pennsylvania was with the Westinghouse Atom Smasher that finished construction and began operation in 1937. The Atom Smasher was not a nuclear reactor, but rather a Van de Graaff electrostatic nuclear accelerator. It output volts rather than watts, and was used for research on nuclear physics, which helped pave the way for development of future nuclear reactors in the state.

The state of Pennsylvania is also the birthplace of nuclear power with civilian applications in the United States. In May 1958 the first commercial nuclear power plant in the country, Shippingport Atomic Power Station, had completed all construction and testing, producing 80 megawatts (MW) of power. This was then increased to 150 MW in 1965 with the addition of a larger reactor, and in 1977 the facility had the first light water breeder reactor on American soil that went to full power production.

Pennsylvania is also the point of one of the most well known nuclear power facility malfunctions on U.S. soil: the Three Mile Island accident. In 1979 the reactor core had a partial meltdown from an electrical failure that inhibited the pumps from sending water to cool the reactor This incident turned into a source of fear and distrust from the public regarding nuclear power which lead to widespread changes in the nuclear power regulation at a national level.

Since the Three Mile Island accident there have been no new nuclear reactors that have been built in the state of Pennsylvania. In 2008 there was an application submitted by Talen Energy for a license for the construction of what would have been the Bell Bend Nuclear Power Plant, however the application was eventually withdrawn in 2016.

In recent years public support for nuclear power has begun to increase in Pennsylvania, however there are no new reactor projects that are currently underway in the state, and some of the existing reactors are being decommissioned.

== Policy Changes ==
Following the Three Mile Island (TMI) incident, policy surrounding the operation and maintenance of Nuclear Power was heavily updated. Pennsylvania, like most states, follows federal nuclear power laws. The operation of nuclear power plants was more heavily scrutinized following this event leading to the United States Nuclear Regulatory Commission revising its standards. Significant decreases in many statistics including; number of reactor events, radiation exposure level. The event also served as a lesson on plant design and safety. Plants were updated and designed to have more safety features from extra fire suppression systems to operational training. Emergency plans and response teams are also commonplace among many plants now. The failure of the “human element” was also a large concern so following this the Institute of Nuclear Power Operations was formed and formed a national academy to help train operators to deal with any emergencies they might face.

== Active Power Plants ==
There are currently four active nuclear power plants in Pennsylvania. The Peach Bottom Atomic Power Station was the second nuclear plant established in Pennsylvania, established in 1966. It was composed of 3 units: two boiling water reactors, and one experimental helium-cooled, graphite-moderated reactor. The Limerick Generating Station also consisted of two boiling water reactors, and is owned by Exelon nuclear, the same company that runs Peach Bottom and is decommissioning Three Mile Island. The Beaver Valley Power Station is owned by FirstEnergy Nuclear Operating Co and consists of two Westinghouse pressurized water reactors. Susquehanna Steam Electric Station is owned by Talen energy and has two General Electric boiling water reactors.

== Non-Active Power Plants ==
There are currently five inactive reactors in the state of Pennsylvania. The Bell Bend Nuclear Power Plant was planned to have been built along the Susquehanna River. It was planned to have a European Pressurized Reactor, but the license application was withdrawn in 2016. The Saxton Nuclear Generating Station was built in Bedford County Pennsylvania, and it was closed on November 7, 2005. The Shippingport Atomic Power Station is located along the Ohio River in Beaver County, and it closed down on October 1, 1982. The Three Mile Island Nuclear Generating Station is located in Londonderry Township along the Susquehanna River. The Nuclear Generating Station suffered from a partial meltdown on March 28, 1979. Three Mile Island was closed on June 20, 2017. Westinghouse Atom Smasher is located in Forest Hills in Allegheny County, and it went dormant in 1958.
