= Three Mile Island Nuclear Generating Station =

Closed power plant in Pennsylvania, US

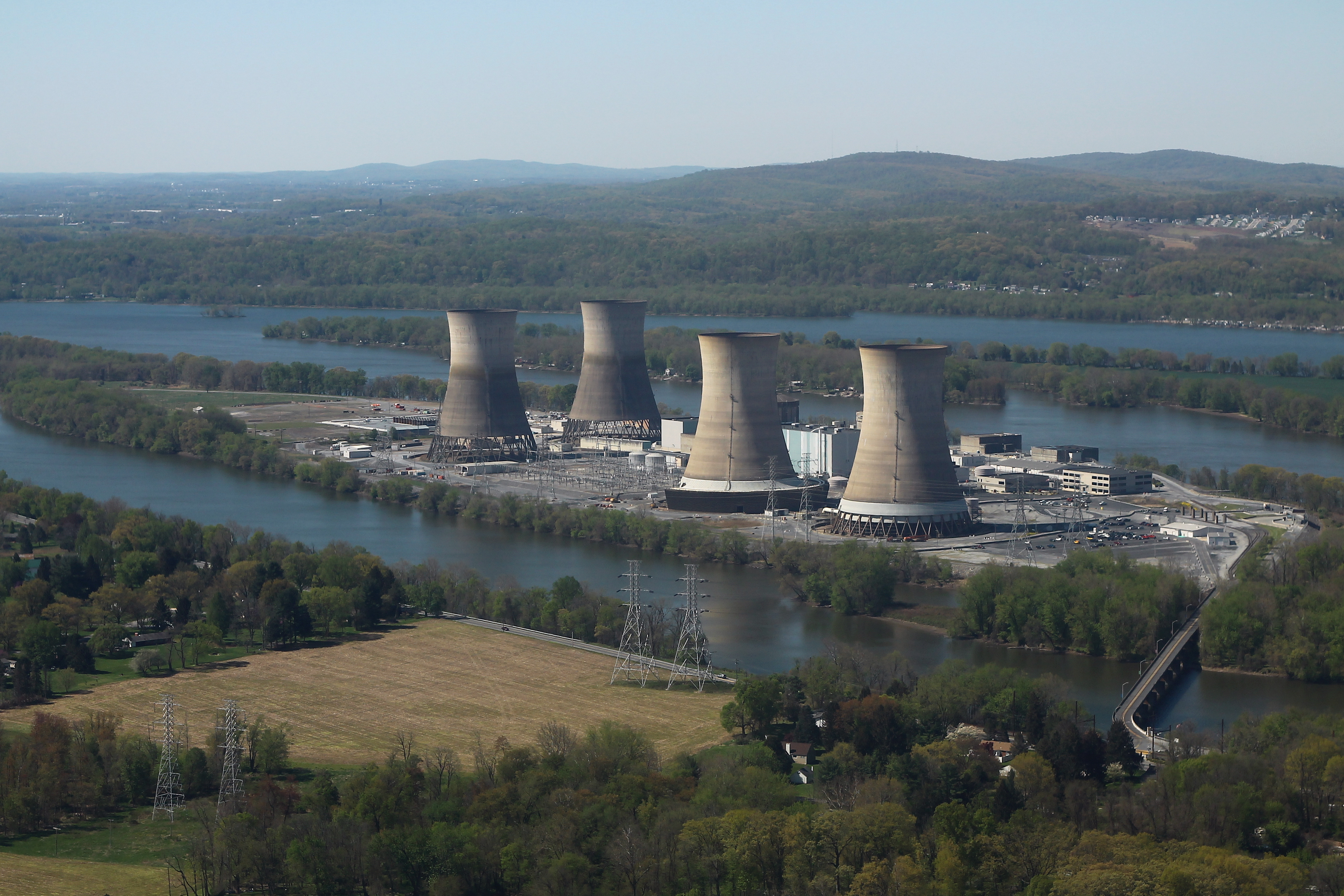
- Official name: Unit 1: Crane Clean Energy Center
- Country: United States
- Location: Londonderry Township, Dauphin County, Pennsylvania
- Coordinates: 40°9′14″N 76°43′29″W
- Status: Mothballed
- Construction began: Unit 1: May 18, 1968; Unit 2: November 1, 1969
- Commission date: Unit 1: September 2, 1974; Unit 2: December 30, 1978
- Construction cost: $1.557 billion (2007 USD) ($2.00 billion in 2025 dollars)
- Owners: Unit 1: Constellation Energy; Unit 2: EnergySolutions
- Operator: Constellation Energy
- Employees: 725 (2017)

Nuclear power station
- Reactor type: PWR
- Reactor supplier: Babcock & Wilcox
- Cooling towers: 4 × Natural Draft, each 113.4 metres (372 ft) tall
- Cooling source: Susquehanna River
- Thermal capacity: 1 × 2568 MW_{th}

Power generation
- Make and model: B&W LLP (DRYAMB)
- Units decommissioned: 1 × 880 MW; 1 × 819 MW (restart planned)
- Nameplate capacity: 819 MW
- Capacity factor: 95.65% (2017); 73.25% (lifetime)
- Annual net output: 7.3 TWh (2018); 245.12 TWh (lifetime)

External links
- Website: www.constellationenergy.com/our-company/locations/decommissioning.html
- Commons: Related media on Commons

Three Mile Island Nuclear Generating Station (abbreviated as TMI), is a shut-down nuclear power plant on Three Mile Island (Note: The name of Three Mile Island is based on an inaccurate survey that estimated the length of the island to be 3 miles; the actual length is around 2.2 miles. Popular incorrect etymologies state that the name is based on the island being positioned 3 miles from Middletown, Pennsylvania or Harrisburg International Airport.) in Pennsylvania, US, on the Susquehanna River just south of Harrisburg. It has two separate units, Unit 1 (TMI-1) (owned by Constellation Energy) and Unit 2 (TMI-2) (owned by EnergySolutions).

The plant was the site of the most significant accident in United States commercial nuclear energy when, on March 28, 1979, TMI-2 suffered a partial meltdown. According to the U.S. Nuclear Regulatory Commission (NRC) report, the accident resulted in no deaths or injuries to plant workers or in nearby communities. Follow-up epidemiology studies did not find causality between the accident and any increase in cancer cases. One work-related death had occurred in September 2021, on-site during decommissioning.

The reactor core of TMI-2 has since been removed from the site, but as of 2009 the site has not been fully decommissioned. In July 1998, Amergen Energy (now Exelon Generation) agreed to purchase TMI-1 from General Public Utilities for $100 million.

The plant was originally built by General Public Utilities Corporation, later renamed GPU Incorporated. The plant was operated by Metropolitan Edison Company (Met-Ed), a subsidiary of the GPU Energy division. In 2001, GPU Inc. merged with FirstEnergy Corporation. On December 18, 2020, FirstEnergy transferred Unit 2's license to EnergySolutions' subsidiary, TMI-2 Solutions, after receiving approval from the NRC.

Exelon was operating Unit 1 at a financial loss since 2015. In 2017, the company said it would consider ceasing operations at Unit 1 because of high costs unless there was action from the Pennsylvania government. Unit 1 officially shut down at noon on September 20, 2019.

Unit 1 decommissioning was expected to be completed in 2079 and would have cost $1.2 billion, but in September 2024, Constellation Energy, the owner of the Unit, announced plans to invest $1.6 billion to bring the facility back online. The plant is expected to resume operations in 2027 as the Crane Clean Energy Center (CCEC). The entirety of the plant's energy output will be sold to Microsoft Corporation. Microsoft entered into a 20-year agreement to purchase as much electricity as possible from the plant, which will support the company’s growing energy needs for its expanding network of data centers.

Unit 2, which has been dormant since the accident in 1979, is expected to close in 2052.

== Emergency zones and nearby population ==
The NRC defines two emergency planning zones around nuclear power plants: a plume exposure pathway zone with a radius of 10 miles (16 km), concerned primarily with exposure to, and inhalation of, airborne radioactive contamination, and an ingestion pathway zone of about 50 miles (80 km), concerned primarily with ingestion of food and liquid contaminated by radioactivity.

The 2010 U.S. population within 10 miles (16 km) of Three Mile Island was 211,261, an increase of 10.9 percent in a decade, according to an analysis of U.S. Census data. The 2010 U.S. population within 50 miles (80 km) was 2,803,322, an increase of 10.3 percent since 2000. Cities within 50 miles include Harrisburg (12 miles to city center), York (13 miles to city center), and Lancaster (24 miles to city center).

== Electricity production ==
During its last full year of operation in 2018, Three Mile Island generated 7,355 GWh of electricity. In that same year, electricity from nuclear power produced approximately 39% of the total electricity generated in Pennsylvania (83.5 TWh nuclear of 215 TWh total), with Three Mile Island Generating Station contributing approximately 4% to the statewide total generation. In 2021 electrical generating facilities in the state of Pennsylvania generated approximately 241 TWh of total electricity.

Generation (MWh) of Three Mile Island Generating Station
Year	Jan	Feb	Mar	Apr	May	Jun	Jul	Aug	Sep	Oct	Nov	Dec	Annual (Total)
2001	598,586	558,484	617,640	540,691	309,720	427,684	591,460	588,699	562,563	130,208	0	491,028	5,416,763
2002	628,077	569,814	631,547	606,413	622,103	575,870	609,816	609,997	595,565	619,838	610,530	633,949	7,313,519
2003	631,984	572,521	631,971	605,628	624,685	597,862	610,219	609,588	592,306	309,494	-8,042	418,815	6,197,031
2004	628,992	592,136	630,817	606,796	595,895	590,383	593,006	609,964	594,931	628,330	606,727	595,257	7,273,234
2005	634,556	574,716	633,072	603,671	622,371	590,245	606,729	606,110	590,523	431,976	227,852	633,640	6,755,461
2006	634,770	574,064	629,263	604,524	620,189	592,955	607,024	610,066	598,981	626,894	533,567	594,731	7,227,028
2007	633,504	571,450	628,411	604,807	616,716	591,972	610,453	608,744	591,535	387,453	173,525	626,724	6,645,294
2008	634,479	593,989	631,886	606,166	622,685	593,699	611,785	615,991	591,191	620,414	610,566	632,247	7,365,098
2009	632,599	571,398	627,785	601,665	613,866	593,159	610,822	607,848	593,508	438,962	-2,703	0	5,888,909
2010	132,230	564,608	571,255	599,167	558,978	586,421	604,409	594,950	568,086	621,174	607,344	625,128	6,633,750
2011	625,004	564,025	622,273	595,735	593,238	589,577	599,464	603,021	563,240	453,968	82,899	626,385	6,518,829
2012	629,556	589,831	624,849	608,509	613,382	596,485	610,350	417,839	478,175	624,454	614,324	630,503	7,038,257
2013	629,685	570,617	629,618	606,648	621,454	595,263	610,260	614,906	599,698	536,504	61,179	583,236	6,659,068
2014	629,732	534,623	629,723	608,793	614,408	614,413	613,793	616,228	598,666	625,480	610,804	630,982	7,327,645
2015	631,581	569,154	629,454	607,974	490,525	594,154	577,760	613,283	593,923	576,594	84,416	629,223	6,598,041
2016	630,503	587,527	627,463	607,175	620,556	588,999	599,964	609,354	593,371	622,807	607,486	387,447	7,082,652
2017	629,440	569,389	629,237	604,756	622,133	594,829	610,064	615,158	336,473	404,367	612,290	632,124	6,860,260
2018	633,552	571,419	630,787	607,853	614,580	594,845	611,421	609,506	594,668	623,620	611,295	632,278	7,335,824
2019	632,206	570,764	629,016	604,853	617,709	594,819	608,513	605,781	350,535	0	--	--	5,214,196

== Three Mile Island Unit 1 ==
The Three Mile Island Unit 1 is a pressurized water reactor designed by Babcock & Wilcox with a net generating capacity of 819 MW_{e}. The initial construction cost for TMI-1 was US$400 million, equal to $2.61 billion in 2018 dollars. Unit 1 first came online on April 19, 1974, and began commercial operations on September 2, 1974. TMI-1 was licensed to operate for 40 years from its first run, and in 2009, its license was extended by 20 years, which means it could have operated until April 19, 2034.

TMI-1 had a closed-cycle cooling system for its main condenser using two natural draft cooling towers. Makeup water was drawn from the river to replace the water lost via evaporation in the cooling towers. Once-through the cooling towers, river water was used in the service water system, cooling auxiliary components and removing decay heat when the reactor was shut down. On February 17, 1979, TMI-1 went offline for refueling. It was brought back online on October 9, 1985, after public opposition, several federal court injunctions, and some technical and regulatory complications – more than six years after it initially went offline.

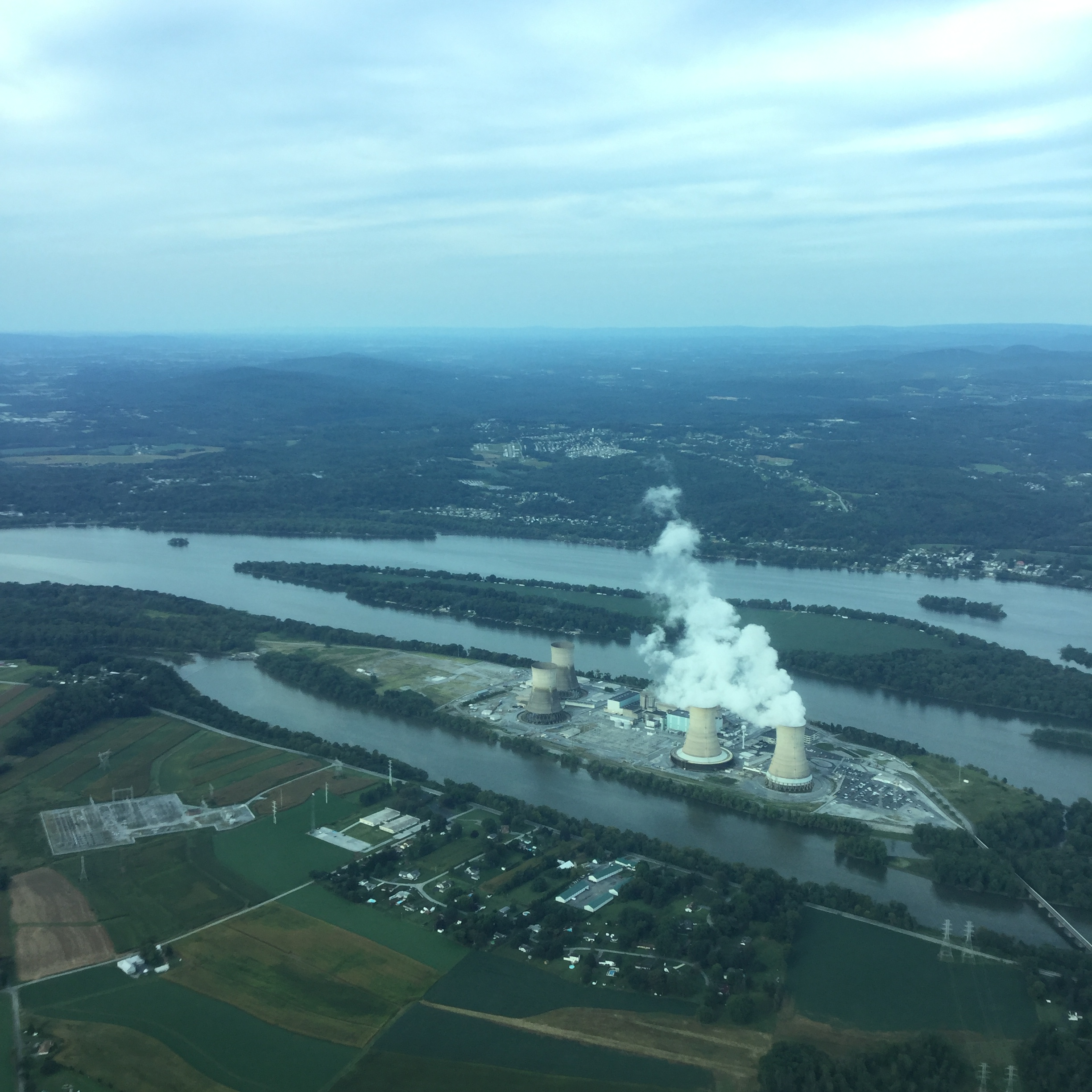
September 2019 photo of Three Mile Island and Goldsboro, Pennsylvania

Unit 1 was scheduled to be shut down by September 2019 after Exelon announced they did not receive any commitments for subsidies from the state, rendering Exelon financially unable to continue operating the reactor. TMI-1 was shut down on September 20, 2019, but may be brought back. The CEO of Constellation Energy, the owner of Unit 1, says the reactor is in "excellent shape," and estimated that it would go online within three years of committing to a restart. As of 2024 Constellation is conducting tests for a potential decision to reopen.

=== Incidents ===
In February 1993, a man drove his car past a checkpoint at the TMI nuclear plant, then broke through an entry gate. He eventually crashed the car through a secure door and entered the Unit 1 turbine building. The intruder, who had a history of mental illness, hid in the turbine building and was apprehended after four hours.

During and following the September 11, 2001 attacks, there was a concern that United Airlines Flight 93 was headed towards Three Mile Island. On that day, the NRC placed all of the nation's nuclear power plants into the highest level of security. United Flight 93 crashed into a field (present-day Flight 93 National Memorial) about 135 miles (217 km) west of Three Mile Island in Stonycreek Township, just outside Shanksville, Pennsylvania, with its actual target believed to have been Washington, D.C.

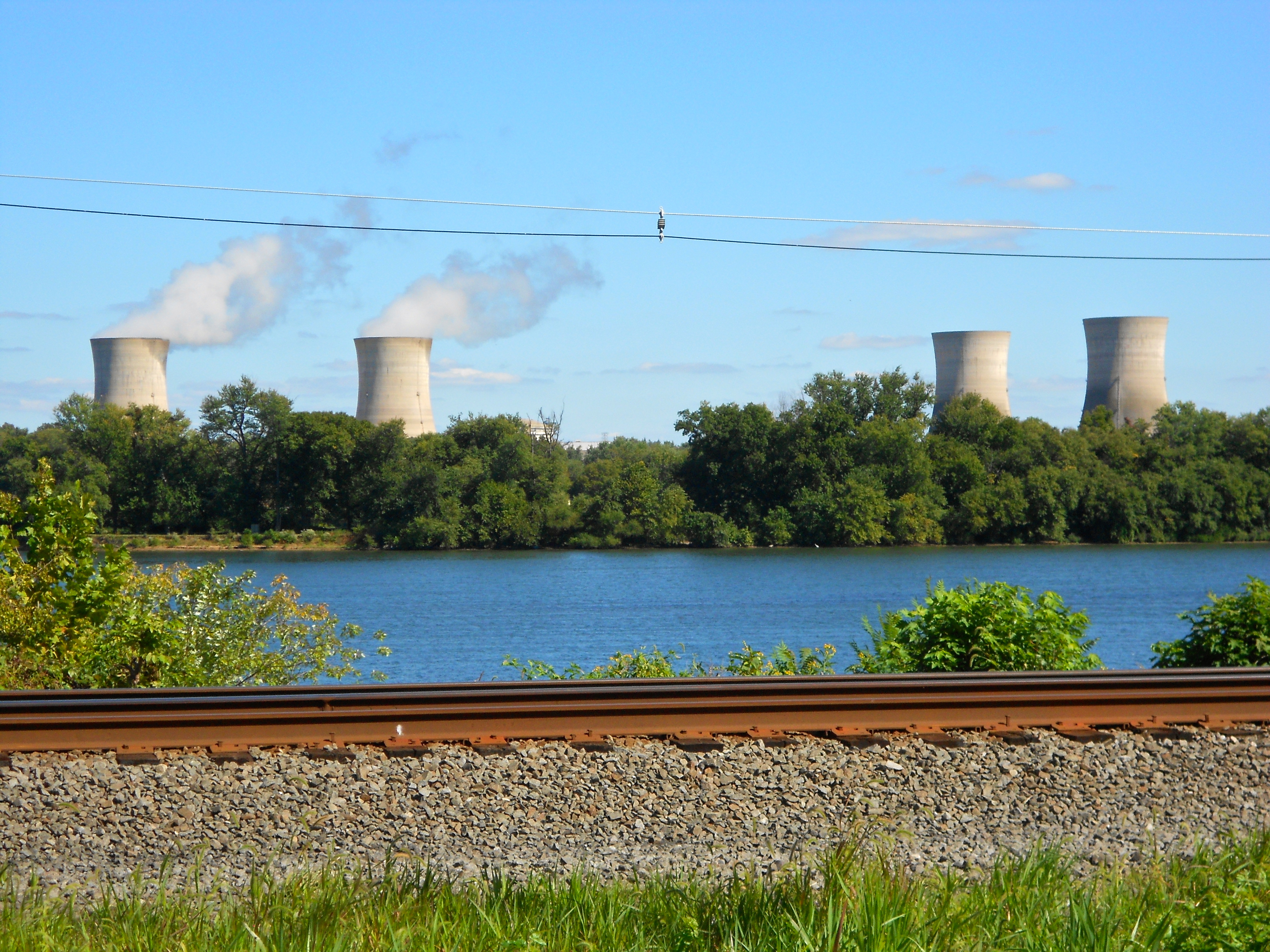
Three Mile Island from Goldsboro, Pennsylvania in 2013

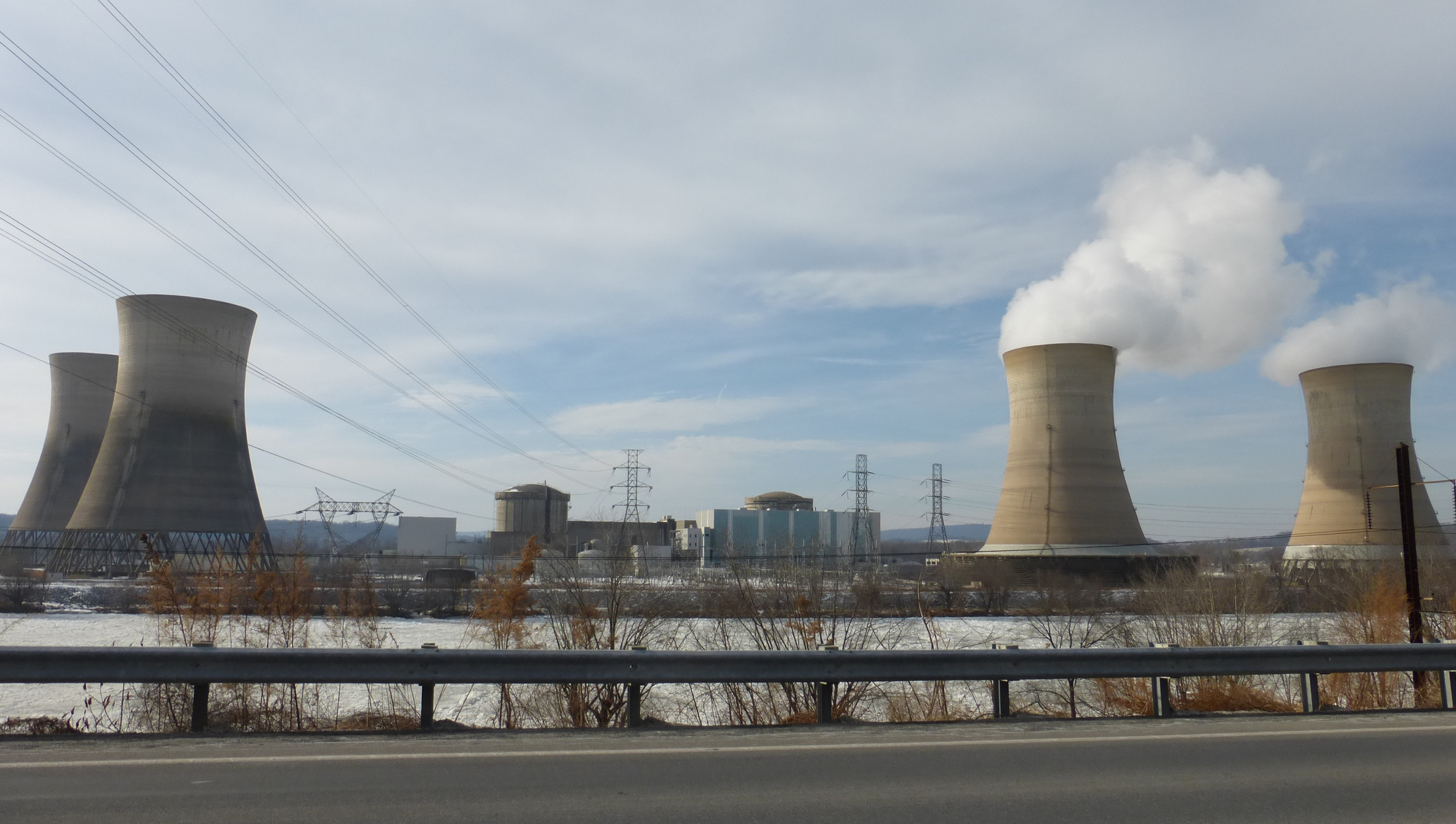
Three Mile Island from Middletown, Pennsylvania in 2014

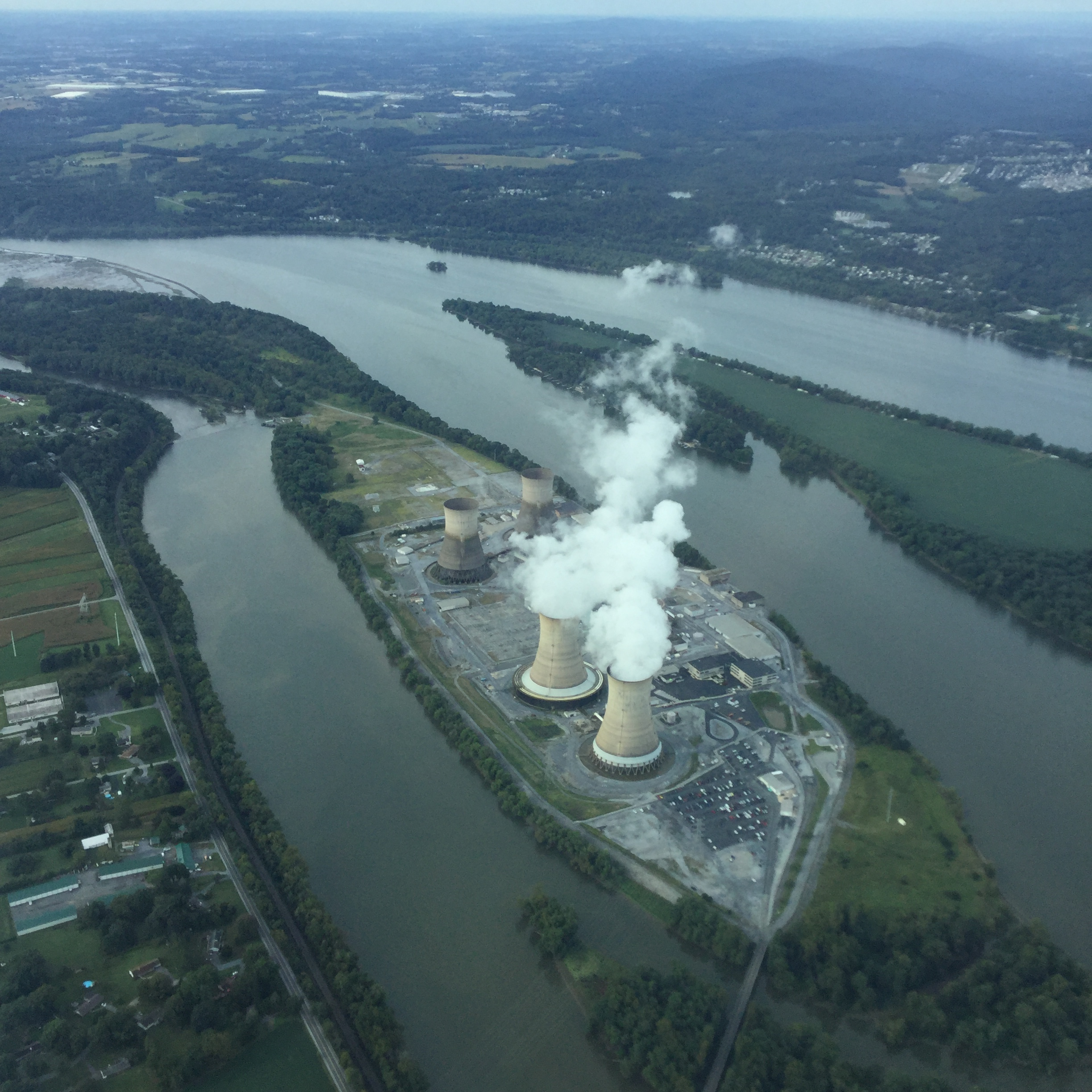
September 2019 photo of Three Mile Island and the Exelon training center and simulator building (left).

On November 21, 2009, a release of radioactivity occurred inside the containment building of TMI-1 while workers were cutting pipes. Exelon Corporation stated to the public that "A monitor at the temporary opening cut into the containment building wall to allow the new steam generators to be moved inside showed a slight increase in a reading and then returned to normal. Approximately 20 employees were treated for mild radiation exposure." As of November 22, 2009, it was believed that no radiation escaped the containment building and the public was not in any danger. The inside airborne contamination was caused by a change in air pressure inside the containment building that dislodged small irradiated particles in the reactor piping system. Some of the particles became airborne inside the building and were detected by an array of monitors in place to detect such material. The air pressure change occurred when inside building ventilation fans were started to support outage activities. The site modified the ventilation system to prevent future air pressure changes. Work continued on the project the following day. On January 24, 2010, TMI-1 was brought back online.

=== Material handling accident ===
On September 10, 2021, a contractor from Alabama was fatally injured while unloading equipment from a truck. Fire and emergency medical personnel from Londonderry Township were dispatched and declared the contractor dead on arrival. The Nuclear Regulatory Commission said the injury was work-related, and the contractor was outside the radiological controlled area.

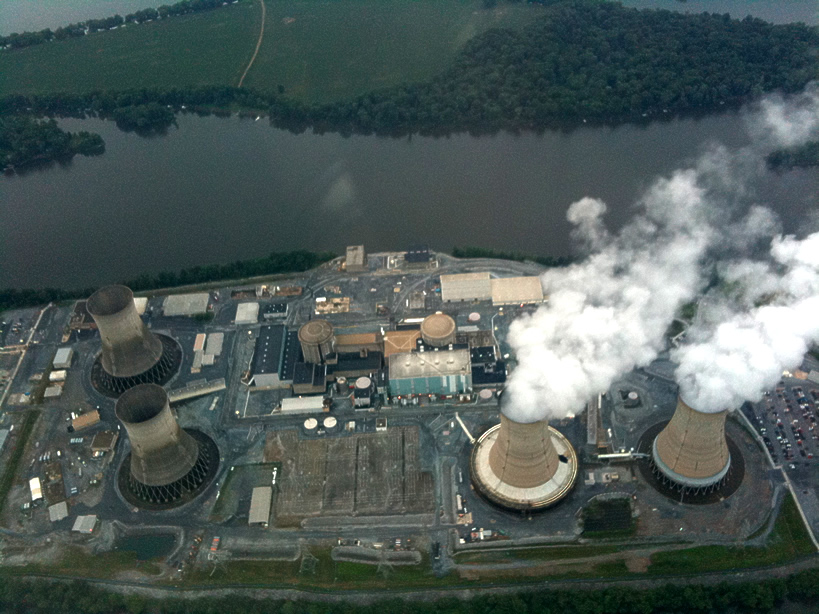
June 2010 Photo of Three Mile Island nuclear power plant with deactivated Unit 2 located on the left.

== Three Mile Island Unit 2 ==
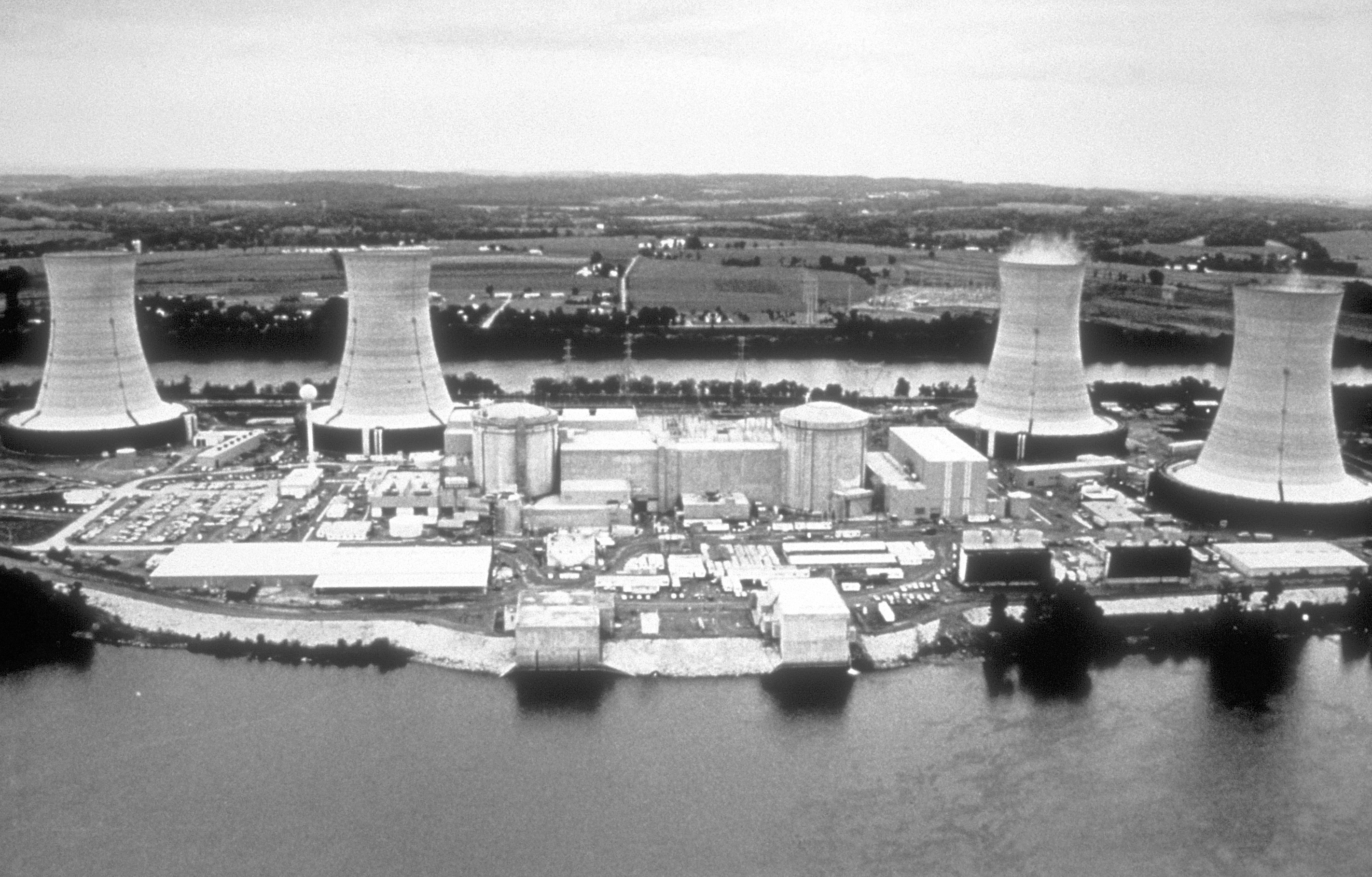
Unit 2 during its time in operation, viewed from the west

The Three Mile Island Unit 2 was also a pressurized water reactor constructed by B&W, similar to Unit 1. TMI-2 was slightly larger with a net generating capacity of 906 MW_{e}, compared to TMI-1, which delivered 819 MW_{e}. Unit 2 received its operating license on February 8, 1978, and began commercial operation on December 30, 1978. TMI Unit 2 was permanently shut down after the Three Mile Island accident in 1979.

=== Accident ===
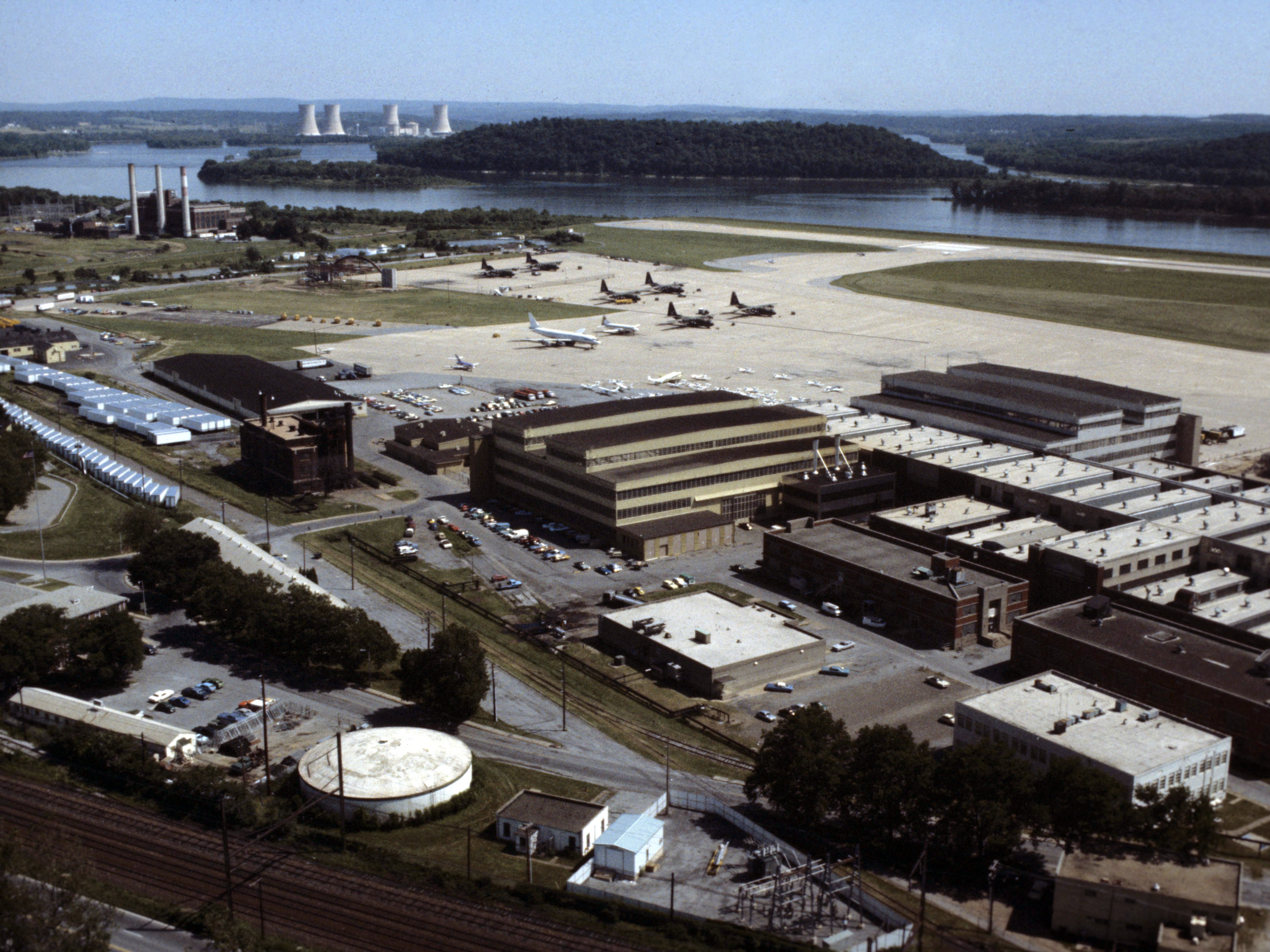
Three Mile Island in background behind Harrisburg International Airport, a few weeks after the accident

On March 28, 1979, a cooling system malfunction caused a partial meltdown of the reactor core. This loss-of-coolant accident resulted in the release of an estimated 43,000 curies (1.59 PBq) of radioactive krypton-85 gas (with an approximate half-life of 11 years), and less than 20 curies (740 GBq) of the especially hazardous iodine-131 (with a half-life of around 8 days), into the surrounding environment.

Nearly 2 million people were exposed to radiation from the accident. A review by the World Nuclear Association concluded that no deaths, injuries or adverse health effects resulted from the accident, and a report by Columbia University epidemiologist Maureen Hatch confirmed this finding. Because of the health concerns, the Pennsylvania Department of Health kept a registry of more than 30,000 people that lived within 5 miles (8.0 km) of TMI at the time of the accident. The registry was kept for nearly 20 years until 1997, when no evidence was found of unusual health effects. Further epidemiology studies have not shown any increase in cancer as a result of the accident. However, almost $25 million was paid in insurance settlements to people who then agreed not to discuss their injuries in ongoing litigation.

Unit 2 has not been operational since the accident occurred.

The New York Times reported on August 14, 1993, 14 years after the accident, that the cleanup had finished. According to the United States NRC, 2.3 million gallons of waste water had been removed.

The incident was widely publicized internationally, and had far-reaching effects on public opinion, particularly in the United States. The China Syndrome, a movie about a nuclear disaster, which was released 12 days before the incident and received a glowing reception from the movie-going public, became a blockbuster hit.

=== Unit 2 Generator ===
On January 22, 2010, officials at the NRC announced the electrical generator from the damaged Unit 2 reactor at TMI would be used at Shearon Harris Nuclear Plant in New Hill, North Carolina. The generator was transported in two parts, weighing a combined 670 tons. It was refurbished and installed during a refueling outage at Shearon Harris NPP in November 2010.

== Post-accident ==
Exelon Corporation was created in October 2000 by the merger of PECO Energy Company and Unicom, of Philadelphia, Pennsylvania and Chicago, Illinois respectively. Unicom owned Commonwealth Edison. The PECO share in AmerGen was acquired by Exelon during late 2000. Exelon acquired British Energy's share in AmerGen in 2003, and transferred Unit 1 under the direct ownership and operation of its Exelon Nuclear business unit. According to Exelon Corporation, "many people are surprised when they learn that Three Mile Island is still making electricity, enough to power 800,000 households" from its undamaged and fully functional reactor unit 1. Exelon viewed the plant's economics of $44/MWh as challenging due to the low price of natural gas at $25/MWh. As of 2016, the average price of electricity in the area was $39/MWh.

== Closure ==
On June 20, 2017, Exelon Generation, the owners of Three Mile Island's Unit 1, sent to the Nuclear Regulatory Commission a formal notice of its intention to shut down the plant on September 30, 2019, unless the Pennsylvania legislature rescued the nuclear industry, which was struggling to compete as newfound natural gas resources drove down electricity prices. Exelon Generation's Senior Vice President Bryan Hanson noted that once Three Mile Island was closed, it could never be reopened for use again. Hanson explicitly stated the reason for the shutdown is because of the unprofitability of Unit 1. Unit 1 has lost the company over $300 million over the last half-decade despite it being one of Exelon's best-performing power plants.

About 70 state legislators signed the industry-inspired Nuclear Caucus but made no financial commitments.

In April 2019, Exelon stated it would cost $1.2 billion over nearly 60 years to completely decommission Unit 1. Unit 1 closed on September 20, 2019.

In 2022, Unit 1 was transferred to Constellation Energy following separation from Exelon. Unit 2 was also transferred to TriArtisan ES Partners, LLC – following their acquisition of EnergySolutions.

== Decommissioning ==
In 2023, TMI-2 Solutions began active cleanup of the reactor site. A temporary building is planned to contain radioactive materials before being shipped to a disposal area. Remotely operated equipment is planned to take a large part in decommissioning due to radioactivity concerns. Originally TMI-2 Solutions planned to finish decommissioning in 2037, but as of 2023 that is projected to be completed by 2052.

Following the TMI-2 accident in 1979, approximately 99% of the fuel and damaged core debris was removed from the reactor vessel and associated systems and shipped to the Idaho National Laboratory near Idaho Falls, Idaho. Since 1993, when the initial cleanup of the plant was completed, TMI-2 has been in a condition known as Post Defueling Monitored Storage (PDMS) and is under constant monitoring to ensure the plant's safety and stability. The remaining 1% of residual fuel at the site is planned to be removed by 2029.

The cost of decommissioning a closed nuclear reactor and related structures at Three Mile Island had been estimated at $918 million, as per a report published in 2013.

== Reopening and Microsoft partnership ==
On September 20, 2024, citing a resurgence in the need for nuclear generated carbon free electricity, Constellation Energy announced plans to reopen Three Mile Island Unit 1 in 2028. It will be renamed the Christopher M. Crane Clean Energy Center, in honor of former Exelon Corporation CEO Chris Crane. Crane, who started his career in nuclear energy as a Reactor Operator with ComEd, retired from Exelon in December 2022 and died on April 13, 2024. In November 2025, the US Department of Energy announced a $1 billion loan to Constellation Energy to support the restart project.

As part of this plan, Microsoft entered into a 20-year agreement to purchase power from the facility once it resumes operation, aiming to support the energy demands of its expanding data centers. Constellation Energy will invest $1.6 billion into the plant’s upgrades, pending regulatory approval.

When TMI-1 was shut down in 2019, safety diesel fuel tanks were drilled into and filled with concrete to eliminate chances of leaks into the environment. Transformers had their oil drained and then were scrapped as Exelon saw little chance for reopening. Thus, replacement transformers for the reopening of TMI-1 cost $100 million in 2025. The steam generators were drained and exposed to air during decommissioning, but were found to be in good condition during inspections in 2025. During inspections, Constellation found no parts that would require so much time to have to push back the scheduled opening past 2028. Since the nuclear facility was deemed to be in excellent condition, there is a chance it could reopen a year early in 2027. In November of 2025, the Loan Programs Office of the United States Department of Energy announced that it would loan $1 billion to Constellation Energy to assist in the project of reopening of Unit 1.

== Seismic risk ==
The Nuclear Regulatory Commission's estimate of the risk each year of an earthquake intense enough to cause core damage to the reactor at Three Mile Island was 1 in 25,000, according to an NRC study published in August 2010.

== See also ==
- Chernobyl disaster – 1986 nuclear accident in the Soviet Union
- Fukushima nuclear accident – 2011 nuclear accident in Japan
- List of nuclear accidents
- Nuclear power in the United States
- Nuclear power in Pennsylvania
