= Allegheny Electric Cooperative =

Electric and transmission cooperative

Allegheny Electric Cooperative, Inc.
- Company type: Cooperative Federation
- Founded: 1946
- Headquarters: Harrisburg, Pennsylvania, United States
- Area served: Pennsylvania and New Jersey
- Members: 14
- Website: http://www.alleghenyelectriccoop.com/

Allegheny Electric Cooperative is an electric generation and transmission cooperative that generates electricity for 14 member electric cooperatives in the states of Pennsylvania and New Jersey in the United States. The cooperative, which was founded in 1946, is based in Harrisburg, Pennsylvania.

== About ==
Allegheny Electric Cooperative is an electric generation and transmission cooperative founded in 1946 that provides wholesale power to 14 electric cooperatives located in the states of Pennsylvania and New Jersey. Allegheny Electric Cooperative generates its electricity from various sources, with renewable energy sources such as nuclear and hydroelectric power accounting for about 65 percent of the energy supply. The cooperative owns a 10 percent stake in the Susquehanna Steam Electric Station, a 2,600 MW, two-unit nuclear power plant in Luzerne County, Pennsylvania, with Talen Energy owning the remaining 90 percent and operating the power plant. Allegheny Electric Cooperative operates the Raystown Hydroelectric Project and William F. Matson Generating Station, a 21 MW, two-unit hydroelectric project located at the Raystown Dam in Huntingdon County, Pennsylvania.

== Members ==
Allegheny Electric Cooperative is composed of 14 member electric cooperatives in Pennsylvania and New Jersey, who are all members of the Pennsylvania Rural Electric Association:

- Adams Electric Cooperative
- Bedford Rural Electric Cooperative
- Central Electric Cooperative
- Claverack Rural Electric Cooperative
- New Enterprise Rural Electric Cooperative
- Northwestern Rural Electric Cooperative
- REA Energy Cooperative
- Somerset Rural Electric Cooperative
- Sullivan County Rural Electric Cooperative
- Sussex Rural Electric Cooperative
- Tri-County Rural Electric Cooperative
- United Electric Cooperative
- Valley Rural Electric Cooperative
- Warren Electric Cooperative
