= Kingsbury Brook =

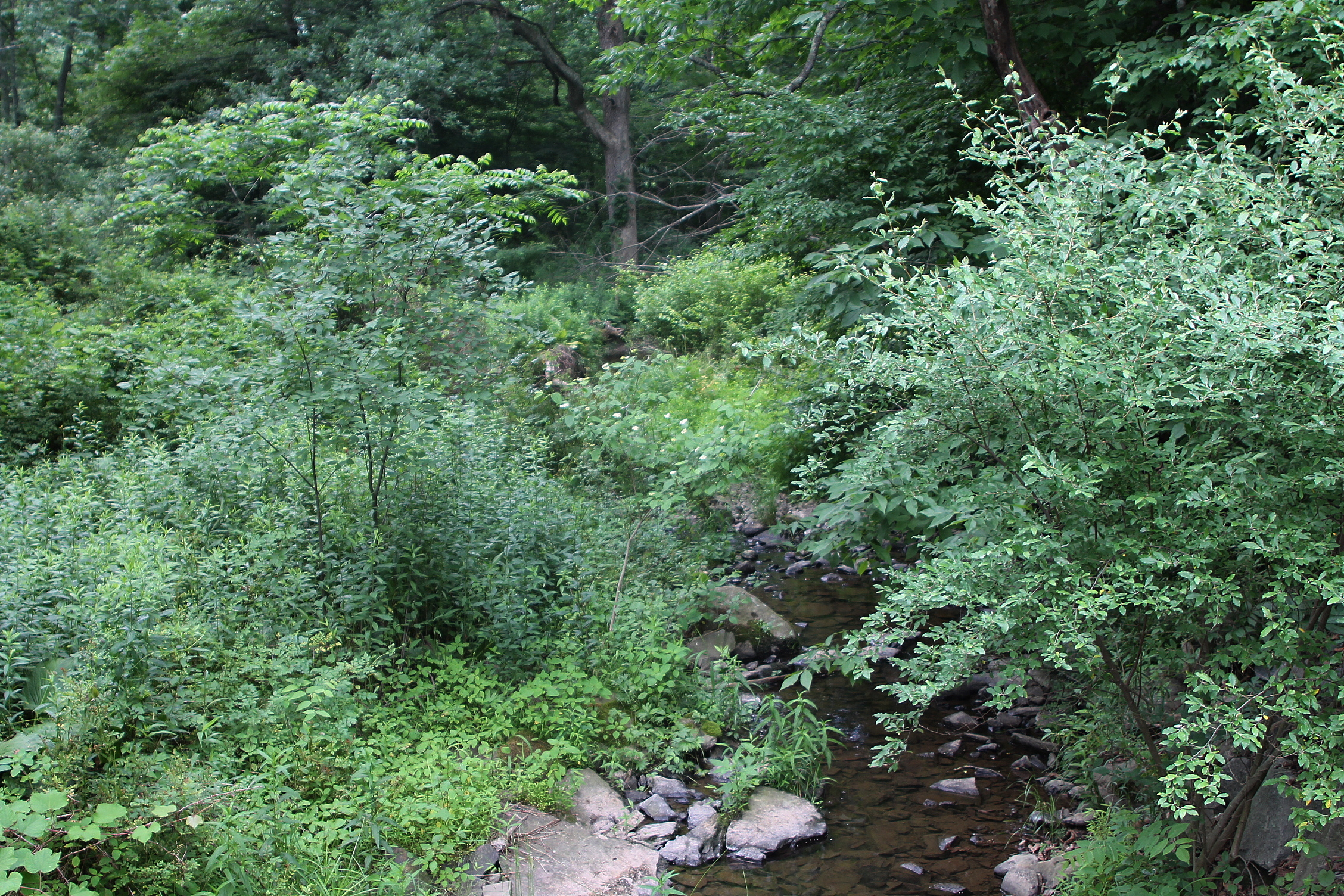
- Kingsbury Brook in its lower reaches

Physical characteristics
- Source
  - location: valley southeast Southdale, in Huntington Township, Luzerne County, Pennsylvania
  - elevation: between 820 and 840 feet (250 and 260 m)
- Mouth
  - location: Huntington Creek in Huntington Township, Luzerne County, Pennsylvania
  - coordinates: 41°08′04″N 76°16′21″W
  - elevation: 692 ft (211 m)
- Length: 1.5 mi (2.4 km)
- Basin size: 1.27 sq mi (3.3 km^{2})

Basin features
- Progression: Huntington Creek → Fishing Creek → Susquehanna River → Chesapeake Bay
- Tributaries
  - left: one unnamed tributary
  - right: one unnamed tributary

Kingsbury Brook is a tributary of Huntington Creek in Luzerne County, Pennsylvania, in the United States. It is approximately 1.5 miles (2.4 km) long and flows through Huntington Township. The watershed of the stream has an area of 1.27 square miles (3.3 km^{2}) and it has two unnamed tributaries. Wild trout naturally reproduce in the stream. The surficial geology in its vicinity mainly consists of alluvium, Wisconsinan Till, Wisconsinan Ice-Contact Stratified Drift, bedrock, and wetlands.

== Course ==
Kingsbury Brook begins in a valley southeast of the community of Southdale, in Huntington Township. It flows southwest for a short distance before turning south-southwest and then west-southwest, passing through a small pond. The stream then turns southwest and receives an unnamed tributary from the right. It then turns south for a few tenths of a mile before crossing State Route 4006 and then receives an unnamed tributary from the left. A short distance further downstream, it reaches its confluence with Huntington Creek.

Kingsbury Brook joins Huntington Creek 6.08 miles (9.78 km) upstream of its mouth.

=== Tributaries ===
Kingsbury Brook has no named tributaries. However, it does have two unnamed tributaries. The first is approximately 0.7 miles (1.1 km) long and the second is approximately 0.8 miles (1.3 km) long and passes through several ponds.

== Geography and geology ==
The elevation near the mouth of Kingsbury Brook is 692 feet (211 m) above sea level. The elevation near the stream's source is between 820 and 840 feet (250 and 260 m) above sea level.

The surficial geology along Kingsbury Brook in its lower reaches mainly features alluvium, which contains stratified sand, silt, gravel, and some boulders. Some Wisconsinan Ice-Contact Stratified Drift, which contains stratified sand and gravel along with some boulders, is present along the sides of the stream's valley. Further away from the stream, the surficial geology includes a glacial or resedimented till known as Wisconsinan Till, as well as a patch of Wisconsinan Bouldery Till. The upper reaches of the stream mainly have Wisconsinan Till in their vicinity. The surficial geology of the area features bedrock consisting of sandstone and shale in a few places.

== Watershed ==
The watershed of Kingsbury Brook has an area of 1.27 square miles (3.3 km^{2}). The stream is entirely within the United States Geological Survey quadrangle of Stillwater.

== History ==
Kingsbury Brook was entered into the Geographic Names Information System on August 2, 1979. Its identifier in the Geographic Names Information System is 1178500.

There is a patch of wetland in the vicinity of the lower reaches of Kingsbury Brook. The stream is near the community of Southdale.

== Biology ==
The drainage basin of Kingsbury Brook is designated as a Coldwater Fishery and a Migratory Fishery. Wild trout naturally reproduce in the stream from its headwaters downstream to its mouth.

== See also ==
- Pine Creek (Huntington Creek), next tributary of Huntington Creek going downstream
- Rogers Creek, next tributary of Huntington Creek going upstream
- List of tributaries of Fishing Creek (North Branch Susquehanna River)
- List of rivers of Pennsylvania
