= Sugar Run (Marsh Creek tributary) =

- Location of Sugar Run mouth Sugar Run (Marsh Creek tributary) (the United States)

Physical characteristics
- Source
  - location: Brier Mountain in Monroe Township, Wyoming County, Pennsylvania
  - elevation: between 1,320 and 1,340 feet (402 and 408 m)
- Mouth
  - location: Marsh Creek on the border between Monroe Township, Wyoming County, Pennsylvania and Eaton Township, Wyoming County, Pennsylvania
  - coordinates: 41°27′15″N 75°59′03″W
  - elevation: 932 ft (284 m)
- Length: 1.3 mi (2.1 km)
- Basin size: 1.36 sq mi (3.5 km^{2})

Basin features
- Progression: Marsh Creek → Bowman Creek → Susquehanna River → Chesapeake Bay
- Tributaries
  - right: one unnamed tributary

Sugar Run is a tributary of Marsh Creek in Wyoming County, Pennsylvania, in the United States. It is approximately 1.3 miles (2.1 km) long and flows through Monroe Township, Northmoreland Township, and Eaton Township. The watershed of the creek has an area of 1.36 square miles (3.5 km^{2}). The creek is not designated as an impaired body and it contains wild trout. The surficial geology in its vicinity consists of Wisconsinan Till, alluvium, Wisconsinan Ice-Contact Stratified Drift, and wetlands.

== Course ==
Sugar Run begins on Brier Mountain in Monroe Township. It flows east-southeast for a few tenths of a mile before entering a valley and turning north-northeast for several tenths of a mile. In this reach, the stream receives an unnamed tributary from the right and enters Northmoreland Township. The steam then turns north-northwest for a short distance and flows along the border between Eaton Township and Monroe Township until it reaches its confluence with Marsh Creek.

Sugar Run joins Marsh Creek 2.24 miles (3.60 km) upstream of its mouth.

== Geography and geology ==
The elevation near the mouth of Sugar Run is 932 feet (284 m) above sea level. The elevation of the stream's source is between 1,320 and 1,340 feet (402 and 408 m) above sea level.

The surficial geology at the mouth of Sugar Run mainly consists of alluvium and Wisconsinan Ice-Contact Stratified Drift. There are also patches of these materials in the stream's upper reaches. In between, the surficial geology consists of wetlands. At the stream's headwaters and on the sides of its valley, the surficial geology consists of a till known as Wisconsinan Till.

== Watershed and hydrology ==
The watershed of Sugar Run has an area of 1.36 square miles (3.5 km^{2}). The stream is entirely within the United States Geological Survey quadrangle of Center Moreland.

Sugar Run is not designated as an impaired waterbody.

== History ==
Sugar Run was entered into the Geographic Names Information System on August 2, 1979. Its identifier in the Geographic Names Information System is 1199638.

In June 2011, the Pennsylvania Fish and Boat Commission made 99 changes to its list of wild trout waters. One of these changes was the addition of the entire length of Sugar Run to its list.

== Biology ==
Wild trout naturally reproduce in Sugar Run from its headwaters downstream to its mouth. When it was added to the Pennsylvania Fish and Boat Commission's list of wild trout streams, at least three young of the year trout or two trout of different ages were observed in it.

== See also ==
- List of rivers of Pennsylvania
- List of tributaries of Bowman Creek
