= Marsh Creek (Rogers Creek tributary) =

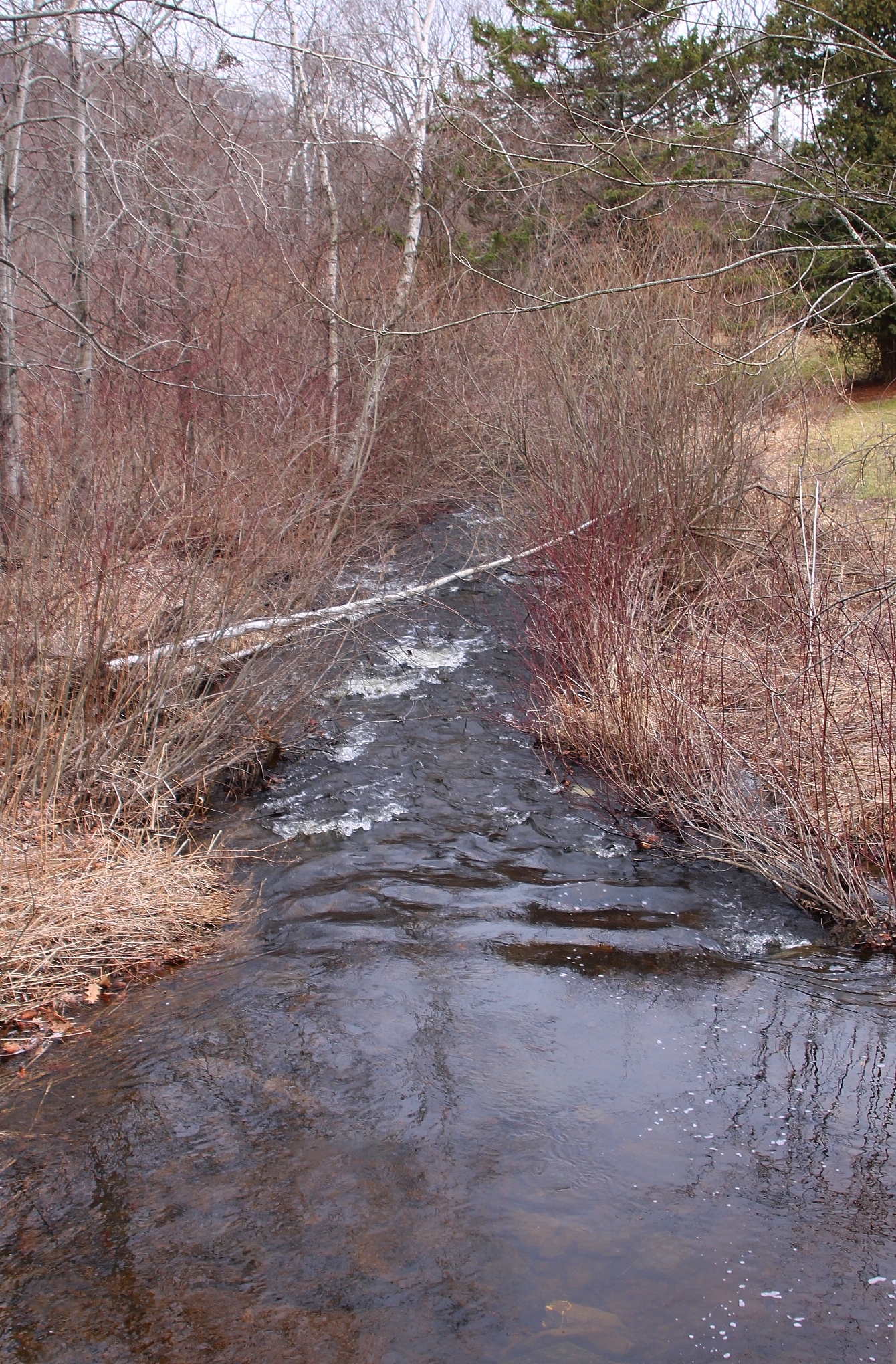
- Marsh Creek looking downstream

Physical characteristics
- Source
  - location: pond in Ross Township, Luzerne County, Pennsylvania
  - elevation: between 1,240 and 1,260 feet (380 and 380 m)
- Mouth
  - location: Rogers Creek in Ross Township, Luzerne County, Pennsylvania
  - coordinates: 41°13′21″N 76°12′51″W
  - elevation: 971 ft (296 m)
- Length: 4.0 mi (6.4 km)
- Basin size: 4.04 sq mi (10.5 km^{2})
- Discharge
  - average: 17.5 cu ft/s (0.50 m^{3}/s) (bankfull discharge upstream of Silo Road)

Basin features
- Progression: Rogers Creek → Huntington Creek → Fishing Creek → Susquehanna River → Chesapeake Bay

Marsh Creek is a tributary of Rogers Creek in Luzerne County, Pennsylvania, in the United States. It is approximately 4.0 miles (6.4 km) long and flows through Ross Township. The watershed of the creek has an area of 4.04 square miles (10.5 km^{2}). Wild trout naturally reproduce within the creek. At least one bridge crosses the creek and the community of Broadway and several wetlands are in the watershed. The surficial geology in the creek's vicinity consists of Wisconsinan Till, Wisconsinan Ice-Contact Stratified Drift, alluvium, wetlands, and bedrock.

== Course ==
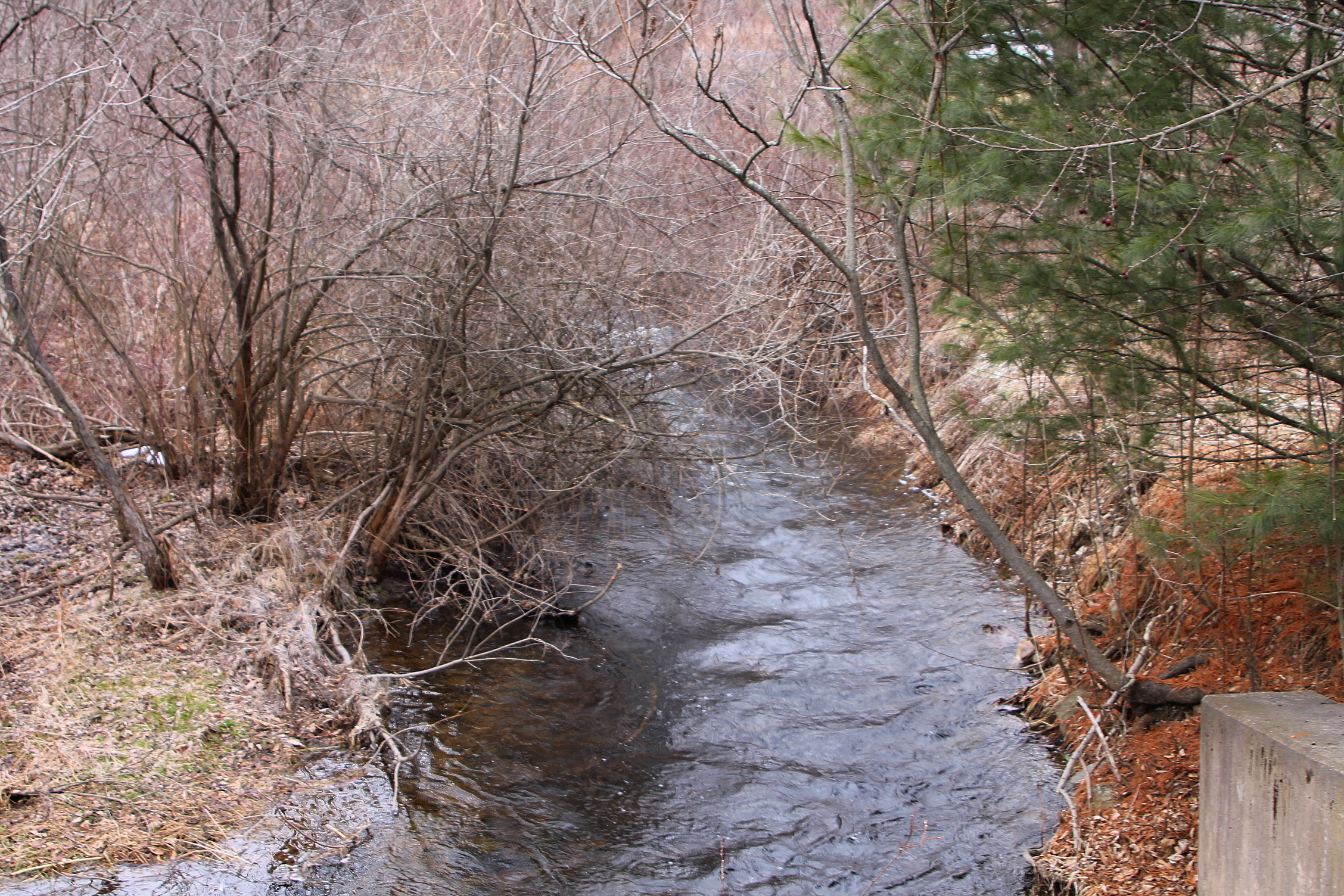
Marsh Creek looking upstream

Marsh Creek begins in a pond in Ross Township. It flows south for a few tenths of a mile before turning west-southwest for nearly a mile. The creek then turns south-southwest for a few miles, receiving two unnamed tributaries from the right. It eventually turns south-southwest for a few tenths of a mile, crossing State Route 4019 before reaching its confluence with Rogers Creek.

Marsh Creek joins Rogers Creek 2.82 miles (4.54 km) upstream of its mouth.

== Hydrology ==
The bankfull discharge of Marsh Creek upstream of Silo Road is 17.5 cubic feet per second (0.50 m^{3}/s). Downstream of that road, the bankfull discharge is 16.5 to 22.5 cubic feet per second (0.47 to 0.64 m^{3}/s).

== Geography and geology ==
The elevation near the mouth of Marsh Creek is 971 feet (296 m) above sea level. The elevation of the creek's source is between 1,240 and 1,260 feet (378 and 384 m) above sea level.

A 360-foot section of Marsh Creek upstream of Silo Road has a bankfull width of 8.1 feet (2.5 m) and a bankfull depth of 1.2 feet (0.37 m). This gives it a relatively low width to depth ratio of 6.6. The creek's channel at this location has a low sinuosity of 1.1 and an entrenchment ratio of 16.0.

A 440-foot section of Marsh Creek downstream of Silo Road has a bankfull depth of 0.7 to 0.8 feet (0.21 to 0.24 m) and a bankfull width of 13.6 to 16.8 feet (4.1 to 5.1 m). This gives it a much higher width to depth ratio than the section further upstream: 16.5 to 22.5. Like the upper segment, the channel at this location has a sinuosity of 1.1, but its entrenchment ratio is much lower at 2.0 to 4.3.

The slope of Marsh Creek near Silo Road ranges from 0.0011 to 0.0037.

Upstream of Silo Road, the streambed of Marsh Creek mainly consists of fine sand. Downstream of that road, the streambed consists of coarse gravel, with an average particle size of 20.3 millimetres (0.80 in). The surficial geology along the creek in its lower reaches mainly consists of alluvium. Further away from the creek, there is a glacial or resedimented till known as Wisconsinan Till, as well as a few patches of Wisconsinan Ice-Contact Stratified Drift and bedrock consisting of sandstone and shale. There is Wisconsinan Outwash near the mouth of the creek and two patches of wetland near Broadway. The upper reaches of the watershed are mainly dominated by Wisconsinan Till, with bedrock occurring along the edges of the watershed. There are also a few patches of alluvium and three patches of wetland.

== Watershed ==
The watershed of Marsh Creek has an area of 4.04 square miles (10.5 km^{2}). The area of the portion that is upstream of Silo Road is 2.8 square miles (7.3 km^{2}). The mouth of the creek is in the United States Geological Survey quadrangle of Shickshinny. However, its source is in the quadrangle of Sweet Valley. A large slope separates the northern part of the watershed from the main stem watershed of Huntington Creek. This hill descends up to 400 feet (120 m) from the Marsh Creek watershed to the Huntington Creek watershed.

Marsh Creek is approximately 11 miles (18 km) north-northwest of the planned Bell Bend Nuclear Power Plant. The creek is also near the small community of Broadway. A road known as Silo Road crosses the creek, separating it into two distinct reaches.

A report by Land Studies described Marsh Creek as being one of the most stable stream reaches in its area. It is similar in terms of geology and land use to Walker Run. Marsh Creek is an E5-type stream upstream of Silo Road and a C4-type stream downstream of that road.

== History ==
Marsh Creek was entered into the Geographic Names Information System on August 2, 1979. Its identifier in the Geographic Names Information System is 1180447.

In 1908, a stone arch bridge over Marsh Creek was proposed. The bridge was to cost $800.00. A prestressed box beam or girders bridge was constructed across Marsh Creek in 1936 and was repaired in 2010. The bridge has a length of 30.8 feet (9.4 m).

A casing well was once dug through 72 feet (22 m) through glacial drift on the west bank of Marsh Creek. A school known as the Broadway School was also historically located near the creek.

== Biology ==
Wild trout naturally reproduce in Marsh Creek from its headwaters downstream to its mouth.

== See also ==
- Black Ash Creek, the other named tributary of Rogers Creek
- List of tributaries of Fishing Creek (North Branch Susquehanna River)
