= Rogers Creek (Pennsylvania) =

Rogers Creek Marsh Creek
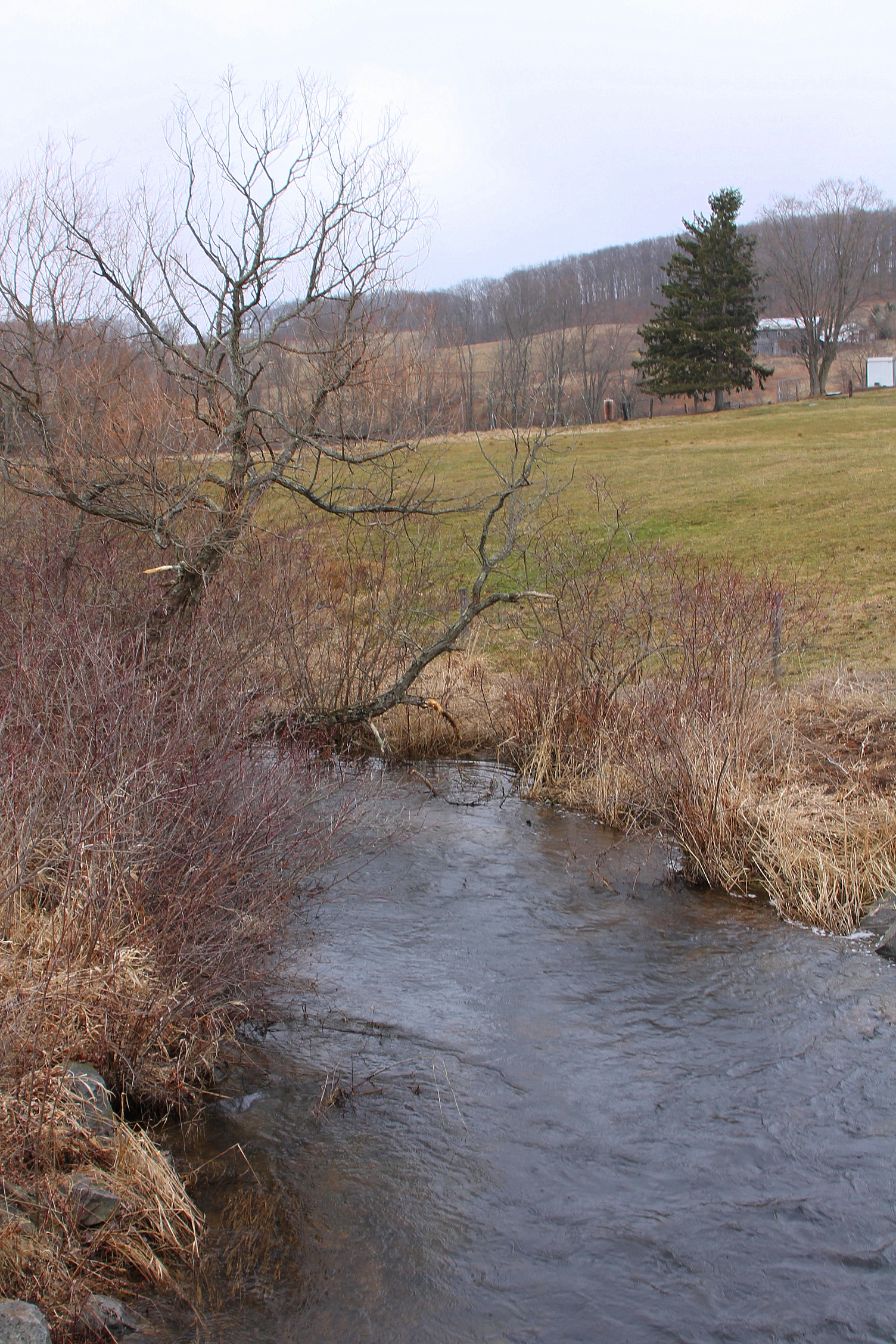
- Rogers Creek looking upstream

Physical characteristics
- Source
  - location: confluence of Marsh Creek and Black Ash Creek in Ross Township, Luzerne County, Pennsylvania
  - elevation: between 960 and 980 feet (290 and 300 m)
- Mouth
  - location: Huntington Creek in Huntington Township, Luzerne County, Pennsylvania
  - coordinates: 41°11′32″N 76°14′09″W
  - elevation: 764 ft (233 m)
- Length: 2.9 mi (4.7 km)
- Basin size: 7.10 mi^{2} (18.4 km^{2})

Basin features
- Progression: Huntington Creek → Fishing Creek → Susquehanna River → Chesapeake Bay
- Tributaries
  - left: Black Ash Creek
  - right: Marsh Creek

Rogers Creek (also known as Marsh Creek) is a tributary of Huntington Creek, in Luzerne County, Pennsylvania, in the United States. It is approximately 2.9 miles (4.7 km) long and flows through Ross Township and Huntington Township. The watershed of the creek has an area of 7.10 square miles (18.4 km^{2}). It is designated as a Coldwater Fishery and a Migratory Fishery. The creek flows through a broad valley in some locations and a gorge in other locations. A number of mills were built along it in the late 1700s.

== Course ==
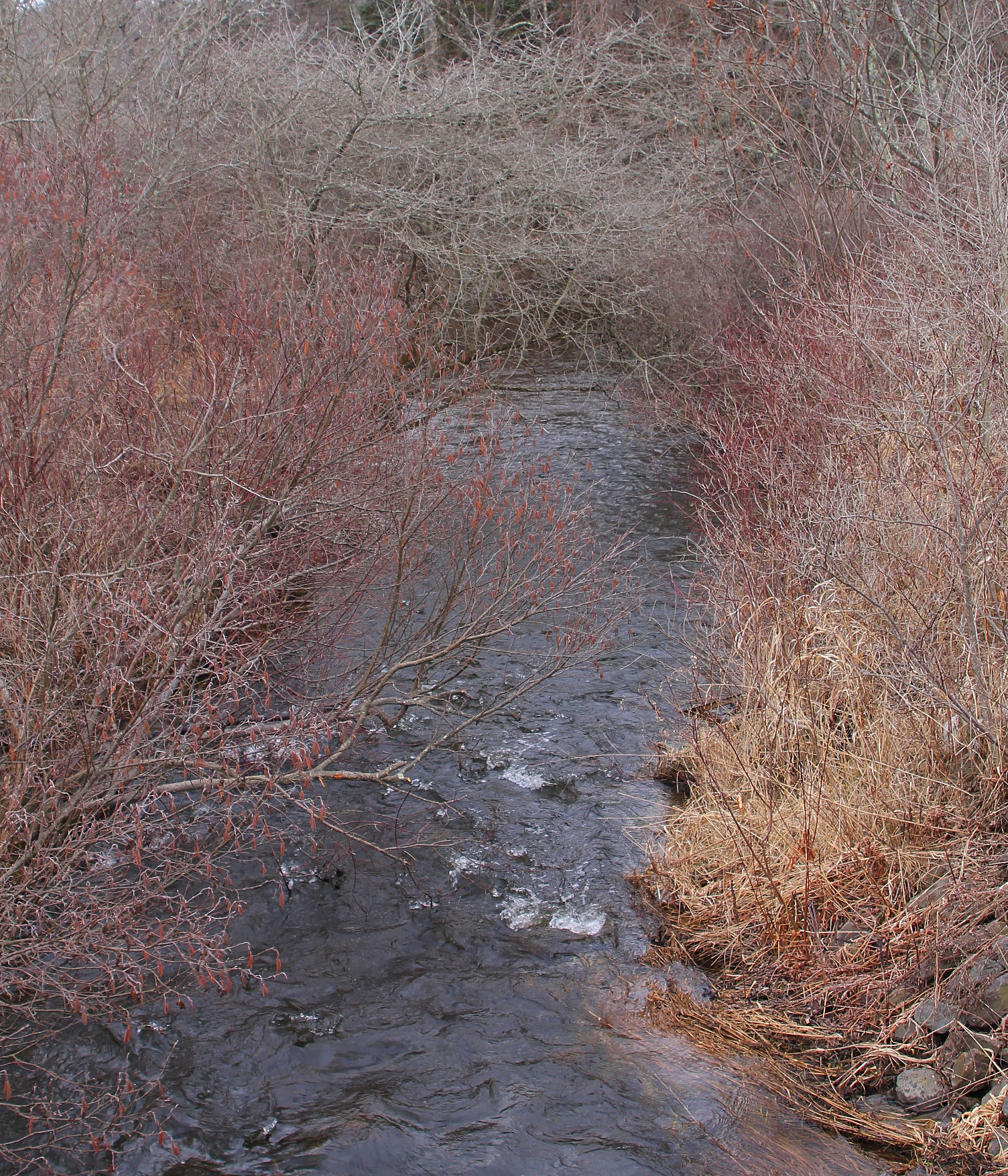
Rogers Creek looking downstream.JPG

Rogers Creek begins at the confluence of the tributaries Marsh Creek and Black Ash Creek in Ross Township. It flows south-southwest for several tenths of a mile, almost immediately entering Huntington Township. The creek then turns west for a short distance before turning south and then meandering south-southwest for several tenths of a mile. It then turns south and after a short distance, reaches its confluence with Huntington Creek at Huntington Mills.

Rogers Creek joins Huntington Creek 12.90 miles (20.76 km) upstream of its mouth.

=== Tributaries ===
Rogers Creek has two named tributaries, which are known as Marsh Creek and Black Ash Creek. Marsh Creek joins Rogers Creek 2.82 miles (4.54 km) upstream of its mouth. Its watershed has an area of 4.04 square miles (10.5 km^{2}). Black Ash Creek joins Rogers Creek 2.82 miles (4.54 km) upstream of its mouth. Its watershed has an area of 1.46 square miles (3.8 km^{2}).

== Geography and geology ==
The elevation near the mouth of Rogers Creek is 764 feet (233 m) above sea level. The elevation of the creek's source is between 960 and 980 feet (290 and 300 m) above sea level.

For a portion of its length, Rogers Creek is in a broad valley with glacial deposits lying underneath it. Further downstream, the creek flows through a narrow bedrock gorge with several waterfalls.

During pre-glacial times, Rogers Creek likely flowed through a saddle 0.5 miles (0.80 km) to the north of the gorge through which it currently flows. The saddle is now filled with glacial deposits and the road from Harveyville to Muhlenburg runs through its former location.

The surficial geology along Rogers Creek mainly consists of alluvium and bedrock consisting of sandstone and shale. In most of the rest of the creek's watershed, the surficial geology features a glacial or resedimented till known as Wisconsinan Till. Wisconsinan Outwash also occurs near the creek's headwaters. There is a patch of wetland in the watershed.

== Watershed ==
The watershed of Rogers Creek has an area of 7.10 square miles (18.4 km^{2}). The creek is entirely within the United States Geological Survey quadrangle of Shickshinny.

== History ==
Rogers Creek was entered into the Geographic Names Information System on August 2, 1979. Its identifier in the Geographic Names Information System is 1185391. The creek is also known as Marsh Creek. This name appears on county highway maps published by the Pennsylvania Department of Transportation.

The first gristmill in Huntington Township was constructed at the mouth of Rogers Creek in 1788 by a Mr. Hopkins. Hopkins also constructed a sawmill at the same location. Nathan Beach constructed the Rogers Mill on the creek in 1798. In the early 1900s, the Commissioners of Luzerne County requested permission to construct a bridge over the creek two miles east of Harveyville.

== Biology ==
The drainage basin of Rogers Creek is designated as a Coldwater Fishery and a Migratory Fishery. Wild trout naturally reproduce in the creek from its headwaters downstream to its mouth. They also do so in the tributary Marsh Creek.

== See also ==
- Kingsbury Brook, next tributary of Huntington Creek going downstream
- List of tributaries of Fishing Creek (North Branch Susquehanna River)
- List of rivers of Pennsylvania
