= Susquehanna Steam Electric Station =

Nuclear power plant in Pennsylvania

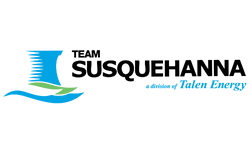

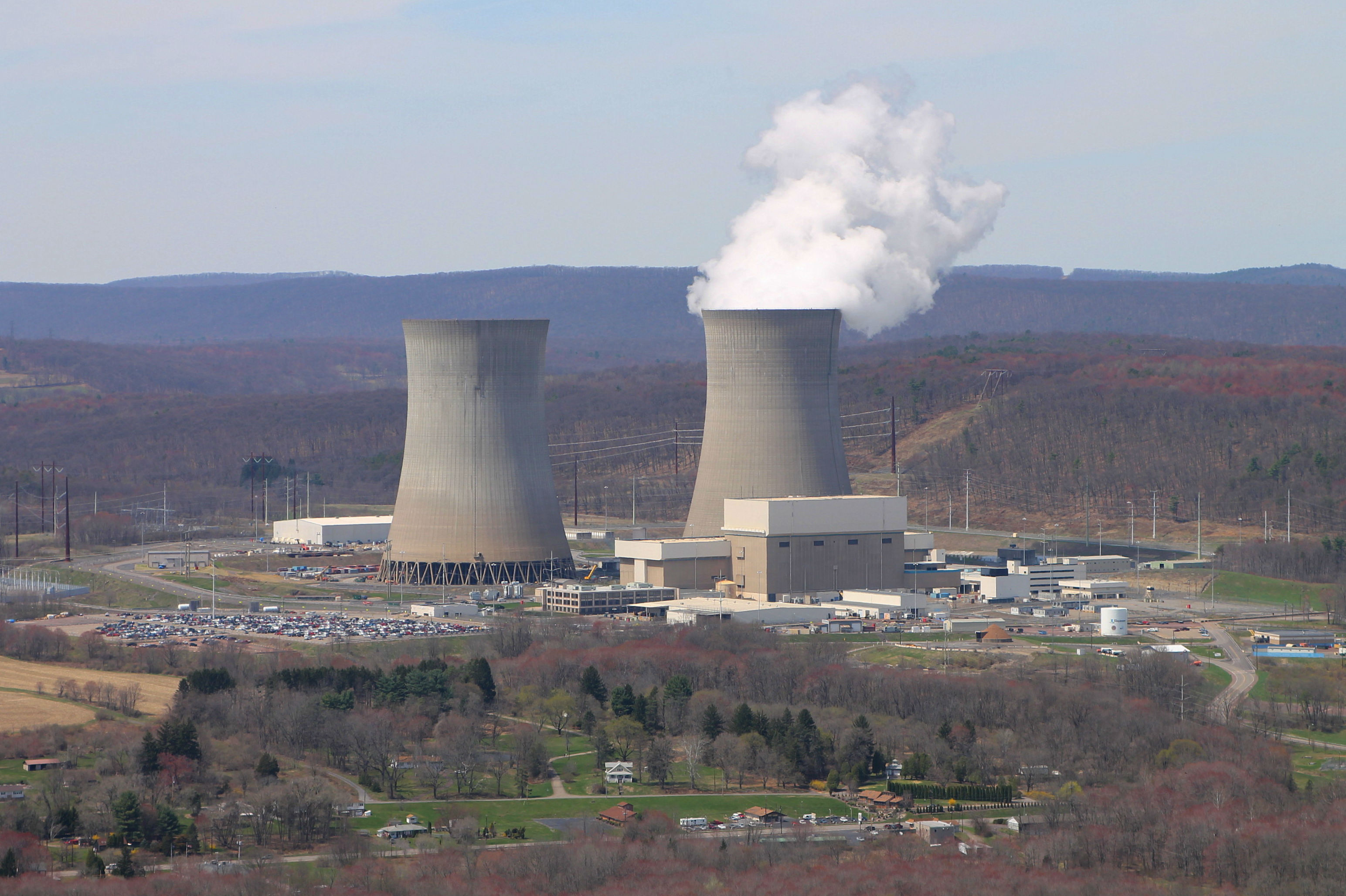
- Country: United States
- Location: Salem Township, Luzerne County, Pennsylvania
- Coordinates: 41°5′20″N 76°8′56″W
- Status: Operational
- Construction began: November 2, 1973
- Commission date: Unit 1: June 8, 1983; Unit 2: February 12, 1985
- Construction cost: $7.983 billion (2007 USD)
- Owners: Talen Energy (90%); Allegheny Electric Cooperative (10%)
- Operator: Talen Energy

Nuclear power station
- Reactor type: BWR
- Reactor supplier: General Electric
- Cooling towers: 2 × Natural Draft
- Cooling source: Susquehanna River
- Thermal capacity: 2 × 3952 MW_{th}

Power generation
- Units operational: 2 × 1350 MW
- Make and model: BWR-4 (Mark 2)
- Nameplate capacity: 2514 MW
- Capacity factor: 94.50% (2017); 85.05% (lifetime)
- Annual net output: 19,943 GWh (2021)

External links
- Website: Susquehanna Nuclear Power Plant
- Commons: Related media on Commons

The Susquehanna Steam Electric Station is a 2.5-gigawatt nuclear power plant in Pennsylvania. Susquehanna produces 63 GWh per day at 2.4 c/kWh, partly to an adjacent data center campus. It is located near the Susquehanna River in Salem Township, Luzerne County, Pennsylvania.

== Operations ==
Susquehanna Station Nuclear, a division of Talen Energy, serves as 90% owner and operator of the Susquehanna Steam Electric Station. PPL operated the plant until June 2015 when Talen Energy was formed from PPL's competitive supply business. The plant has two General Electric boiling water reactors within a Mark II containment building on a site of 1,075 acres (435 ha), with approximately 900 employees working on site and additional support employees in Allentown, Pennsylvania. Harrisburg-based Allegheny Electric Cooperative purchased 10% of the plant in 1977.

The station has been in operation since 1983. The prime builder was Bechtel Power Corporation of Reston, Virginia. In November 2009, the Nuclear Regulatory Commission (NRC) extended the operation licenses of the reactors for an additional 20 years and the station has received additional license extensions since then with Unit 1 licensed through 2042 and Unit 2 through 2044.

== Data center ==
Cumulus Data, a subsidiary of Talen Energy, developed a data center campus directly connected at 300 MW to the Susquehanna plant. On January 17, 2023, it completed the phase 1 construction. On March 4, 2024, it was sold to Amazon Web Services for 650 million dollars. As part of the transaction, the Susquehanna station will provide power to the data center campus; 840—1,200 MW in 2029 and 1,680—1,920 MW in 2032, continuing to 2042. The power increase depends on Amazon's expansion of the data center. The energy has an expected value of $18 billion.

== Electricity production ==
Generation (MWh) of Susquehanna Steam Electric Station
Year	Jan	Feb	Mar	Apr	May	Jun	Jul	Aug	Sep	Oct	Nov	Dec	Annual (Total)
2001	1,641,381	1,482,806	1,050,655	909,095	1,533,526	1,568,380	1,626,269	1,618,389	1,586,322	1,639,836	1,593,926	1,614,081	17,864,666
2002	1,627,242	1,368,563	813,610	959,909	1,648,911	1,586,051	1,634,103	1,631,149	1,583,552	1,274,053	1,607,308	1,663,585	17,398,036
2003	1,640,809	1,422,792	976,200	1,022,446	1,649,299	1,575,937	1,652,085	1,643,323	1,387,214	1,667,531	1,625,346	1,696,767	17,959,749
2004	1,650,478	1,403,764	864,302	988,853	1,668,931	1,617,379	1,680,026	1,666,301	1,618,848	1,695,244	1,449,297	1,719,678	18,023,101
2005	1,723,149	1,381,611	1,038,859	1,483,961	1,685,803	1,468,806	1,640,526	1,657,191	1,616,810	1,603,341	1,239,475	1,724,827	18,264,359
2006	1,723,425	1,532,732	928,498	1,236,026	1,552,576	1,503,961	1,639,653	1,661,875	1,581,886	1,175,403	1,541,913	1,727,484	17,805,432
2007	1,724,278	1,557,034	909,886	1,163,118	1,703,662	1,623,539	1,676,569	1,669,359	1,629,479	1,181,577	1,667,967	1,731,434	18,237,902
2008	1,731,666	1,610,267	942,630	1,135,197	1,734,942	1,635,252	1,703,041	1,672,452	1,662,760	1,751,662	1,693,887	1,766,058	19,039,814
2009	1,771,827	1,602,695	1,726,689	1,004,345	1,188,205	1,689,774	1,756,807	1,745,430	1,694,390	1,783,800	1,739,475	1,783,220	19,486,657
2010	1,807,052	1,565,156	919,205	690,462	1,565,552	1,729,962	1,316,879	1,677,543	1,761,339	1,824,897	1,796,169	1,861,363	18,515,579
2011	1,728,725	1,682,644	1,590,450	1,028,381	445,235	86,601	1,610,334	1,700,558	1,816,715	1,904,803	1,844,903	1,924,377	17,363,726
2012	1,915,903	1,795,186	1,841,550	921,187	864,309	704,284	1,728,928	1,826,063	1,826,134	1,162,708	878,645	1,449,460	16,914,357
2013	1,913,584	1,726,984	1,912,078	1,276,158	225,721	1,141,016	1,741,591	1,869,464	1,455,597	1,894,580	1,819,764	1,922,526	18,899,063
2014	1,913,406	1,703,367	1,116,604	1,258,937	936,728	1,388,426	1,705,009	1,814,722	1,490,264	1,891,172	1,860,863	1,701,797	18,781,295
2015	1,928,439	1,735,532	1,954,556	1,215,948	1,063,232	1,807,193	1,870,327	1,868,367	1,797,288	1,884,454	1,564,364	1,901,560	20,591,260
2016	1,915,434	1,735,811	1,234,864	885,516	1,601,861	1,123,585	1,846,755	1,844,095	1,804,267	1,643,232	1,807,301	1,908,254	19,350,975
2017	1,910,531	1,665,417	1,032,548	1,494,551	1,878,682	1,724,092	1,844,050	1,858,879	1,732,211	1,872,981	1,844,843	1,893,780	20,752,565
2018	1,903,980	1,644,670	1,694,732	907,337	1,730,401	1,804,216	1,837,720	1,566,621	1,778,638	1,877,072	1,836,176	1,887,159	20,468,722
2019	1,879,592	1,625,064	1,493,473	1,156,300	1,863,184	1,803,796	1,852,517	1,867,551	1,796,823	1,884,813	1,831,458	1,864,436	20,919,007
2020	1,832,553	1,482,539	1,536,238	895,446	1,475,102	1,711,863	1,848,934	1,849,871	1,798,231	1,858,398	1,828,551	1,873,177	19,990,903
2021	1,826,498	1,553,674	1,403,996	1,062,730	1,864,787	1,794,454	1,638,047	1,854,408	1,808,079	1,644,610	1,819,233	1,673,030	19,943,546
2022	1,841,431	1,591,781	1,566,471	866,125	1,644,935	1,746,251	1,818,542	1,821,939	1,728,111	1,759,022	1,814,194	1,866,229	20,065,031
2023	1,713,699	1,629,401	1,337,612	997,065	1,724,610	1,683,485	1,702,201	1,734,624	1,627,409	1,740,751	1,364,045	1,746,058	19,000,960
2024	1,751,969	1,632,208	1,461,496	878,917	1,804,995	1,727,658	1,733,799	1,788,118	1,576,135	1,817,979	1,748,160	1,823,010	19,744,444
2025	1,821,415	1,605,879	1,472,325	887,799	909,550	1,555,146	1,609,683	1,781,007	1,762,078	1,694,890	1,609,702	1,857,192	18,566,666
2026	1,817,168	1,597,423	1,464,102	888,501	1,680,387	1,779,904	1,810,976	1,841,081					--

== Abandoned plans for an adjacent power plant ==
In 2008, PPL filed an application with the U.S. Nuclear Regulatory Commission for a license to build and operate a new nuclear plant under consideration near Berwick, Pennsylvania. The Bell Bend Nuclear Power Plant would be built near the company’s existing two-unit Susquehanna nuclear power plant. On August 30, 2016, Talen Energy formally requested the license application be withdrawn, and the NRC officially accepted the application withdrawal on September 22, 2016, officially cancelling the project. Unlike the existing two units, which are American-designed boiling water reactors, the plan called for the French-German EPR which is a pressurized water reactor. At 1.6 Gigawatt net electric nameplate capacity (1.66 GW in the case of Taishan nuclear power plant), the EPR is the nuclear power plant design with the highest per-reactor electric power output ever built.

== Incidents ==
In the plant's first emergency, an electrical fire erupted at a switch box that controls the supply of cooling water to emergency systems. No injuries were reported following the 1982 incident.

Roughly 10,000 gallons of mildly radioactive water spilled at the Station's Unit 1 turbine building after a gasket failed in the filtering system in 1985. No radiation was released from the building to the public, and no personnel were contaminated as a result of this incident.

== Surrounding population ==
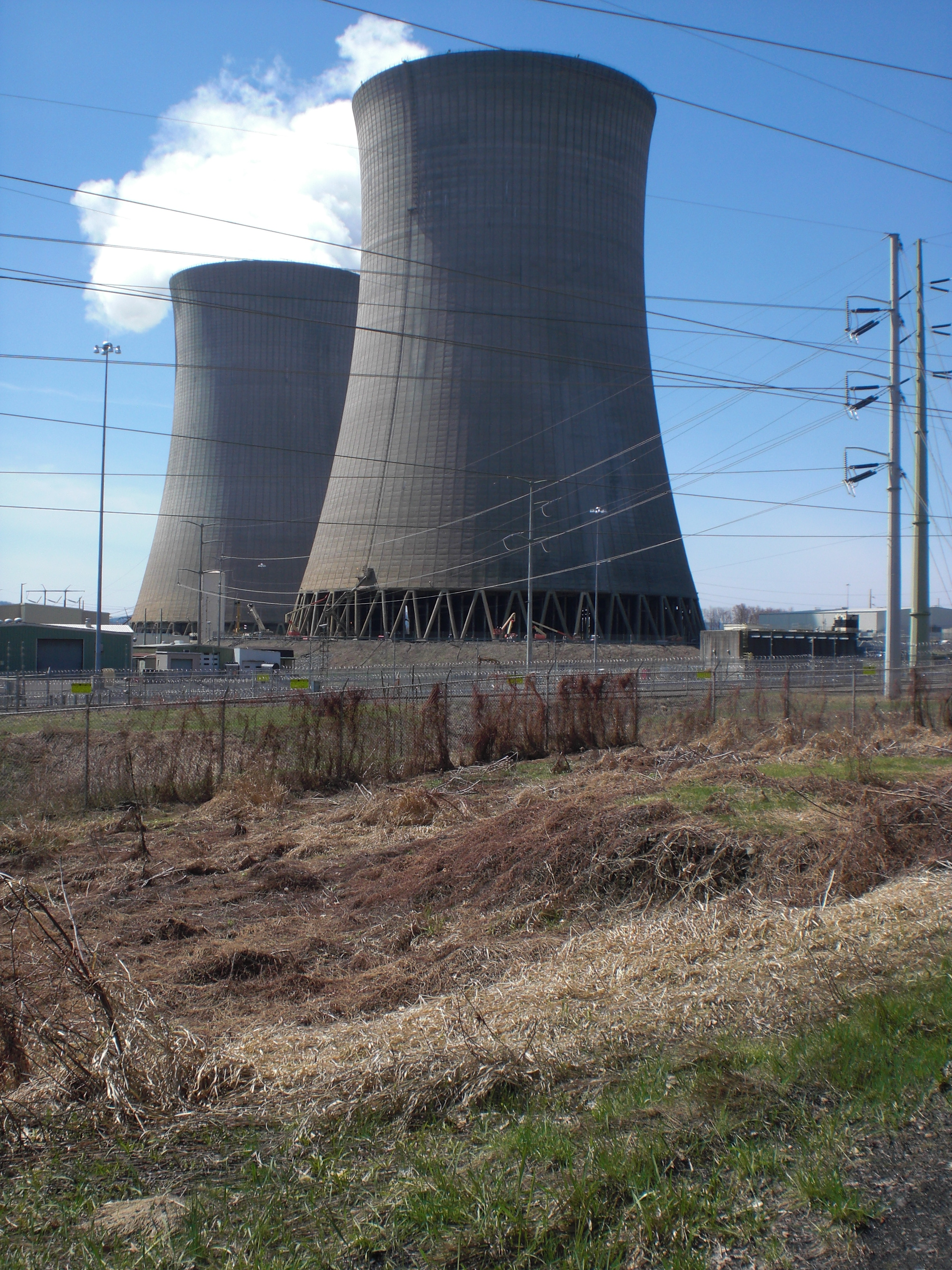
One of the power plant's cooling towers from the north

The NRC defines two emergency planning zones around nuclear power plants: a plume exposure pathway zone with a radius of 10 miles (16 km), concerned primarily with exposure to, and inhalation of, airborne radioactive contamination, and an ingestion pathway zone of about 50 miles (80 km), concerned primarily with ingestion of food and liquid contaminated by radioactivity.

The 2010 U.S. population within 10 miles (16 km) of Susquehanna was 54,686, an increase of 3.3 percent in a decade, according to an analysis of U.S. Census data for msnbc.com. The 2010 U.S. population within 50 miles (80 km) was 1,765,761, an increase of 5.5 percent since 2000. Cities within 50 miles include Wilkes-Barre (18 miles to city center) and the larger city, Scranton (33 miles to center city).

== Seismic risk ==
The NRC's estimate of the risk each year of an earthquake intense enough to cause core damage to the reactor at Susquehanna was 1 in 76,923, according to an NRC study published in August 2010.

== See also ==
- List of largest power stations in the United States
