= Marsh Township =

Marsh Township may refer to the following townships in the United States:

- Marsh Township, Surry County, North Carolina
- Marsh Township, Barnes County, North Dakota

== See also ==
- Marsh Creek Township, Mahnomen County, Minnesota
- Marsh Grove Township, Marshall County, Minnesota
