= Marsh Lake (disambiguation) =

Marsh Lake is a part of the Yukon River in Yukon, Canada.

Marsh Lake or Lake Marsh may refer to:

== Lakes ==
=== Canada ===
- Marsh Lake (Lunenburg), a lake in the Municipal District of Lunenburg, Nova Scotia
- Marsh Lake (Nova Scotia), a lake of Halifax Regional Municipality, Nova Scotia

=== United States ===
- Marsh Lake in Desha County, Arkansas
- Marsh Lake, a lake in Carver County, Minnesota
- Marsh Lake (Hennepin) in Bloomington, Minnesota
- Marsh Lake, Laketown Township, Minnesota
- Marsh Lake, a lake in Lac Qui Parle County, Minnesota
- Lake Marsh (South Dakota)

== Other uses ==
- Marsh Lake, Yukon, an unincorporated community in Canada
