= Marsh Island =

Marsh Island may refer to:

- Marsh Island (Florida)
- Marsh Island (Louisiana)
- Marsh Island (Maine)
- Marsh Island (Washington), in Union Bay, Seattle
