= Marsh Hotel =

Historical Hotel In Ohio

Coordinates: 40°52′10″N 84°34′54″W

The Marsh Hotel, often also referred to as The Hotel Marsh is located on East Main Street in downtown Van Wert, Ohio. Though it is no longer in operation it is a historic part of micropolitan Van Wert having seen many owners in its 100+ years in existence.

At one point, the hotel served as the Van Wert station of an interurban railroad.

== History ==
George Marsh contracted Zook and Wilson of Van Wert to construct a new hotel for a cost of $28,757. Rupright Brothers supplied the brick at a cost of $2,506.79. The hotel opened in 1915. There were fifty guest rooms, each with elegant furnishings, electric call bell, gas and electric light, hot and cold water, with bath and toilet rooms on each floor. Hotel Marsh was noted for its irreproachable culinary and varied menus and was recognized as one of the most inviting hostelries in the state.

The Marsh Hotel, was a control station for the Lincoln Highway.

In 1931, the hotel was extensively remodeled at a cost of $160,000.

Although the upper floors are only used for storage, the main floor of the Hotel including lobby and dining room are used as a private banquet facility, popular for weddings, receptions, and corporate events. The finished basement is also available for rental as a venue for parties and receptions.
