= Marsh Creek (Bowman Creek tributary) =

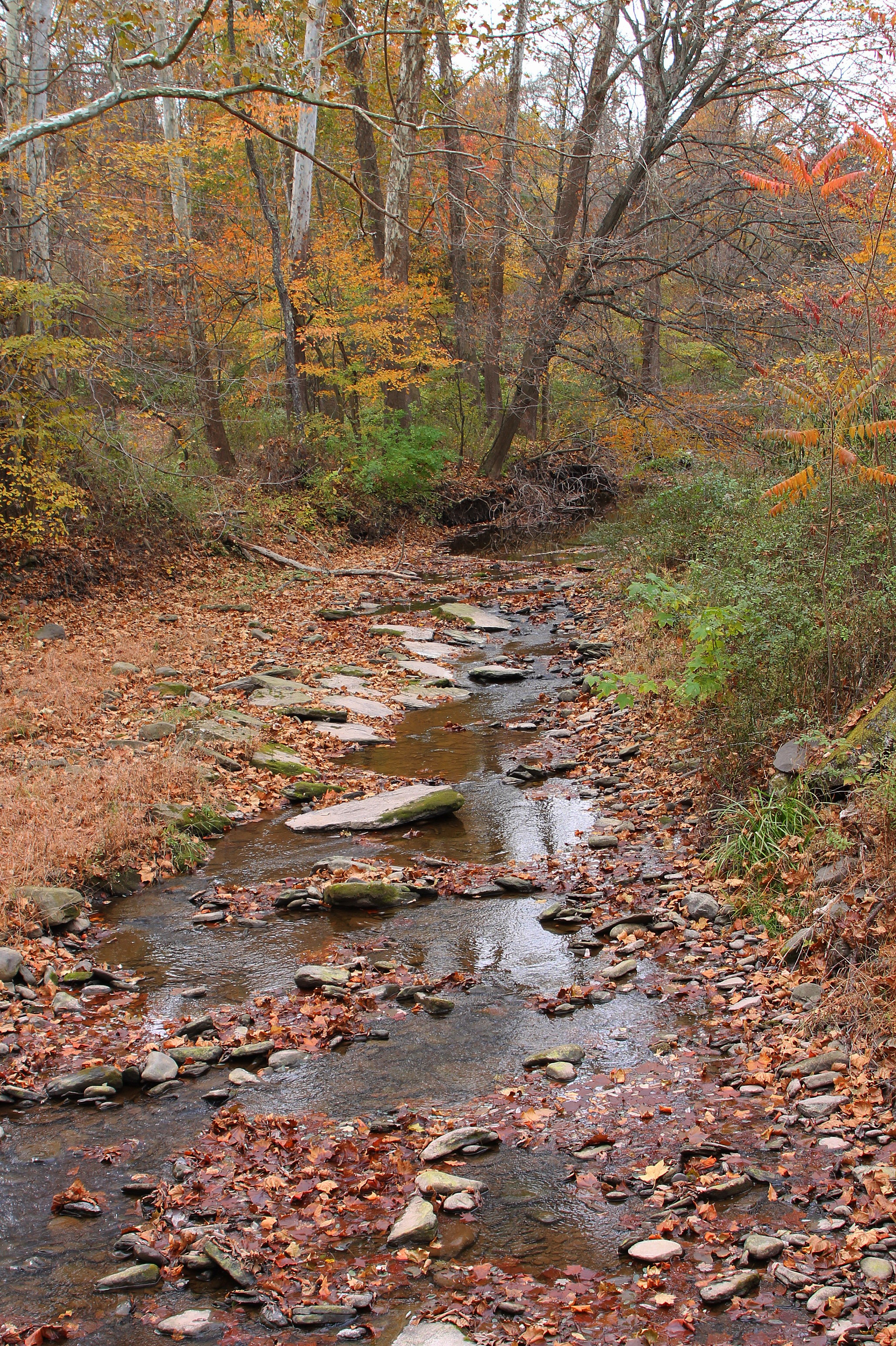
- Marsh Creek looking upstream from Jenks Road

Physical characteristics
- Source
  - location: base of a ridge in Northmoreland Township, Pennsylvania
  - elevation: between 1,160 and 1,180 feet (354 and 360 m)
- Mouth
  - location: Bowman Creek in Eaton Township, Wyoming County, Pennsylvania
  - coordinates: 41°28′25″N 75°59′24″W
  - elevation: 712 ft (217 m)
- Length: 5.6 mi (9.0 km)
- Basin size: 10.2 sq mi (26 km^{2})

Basin features
- Progression: Bowman Creek → Susquehanna River → Chesapeake Bay
- Tributaries
  - left: Sugar Run

Marsh Creek is a tributary of Bowman Creek in Wyoming County, Pennsylvania, in the United States. It is approximately 5.6 miles (9.0 km) long and flows through Northmoreland Township, Eaton Township, and Monroe Township. The watershed of the creek has an area of 10.2 square miles (26 km^{2}). The creek is not designated as an impaired waterbody. Wild trout naturally reproduce within it. The watershed of Marsh Creek is designated as a High-Quality Coldwater Fishery and a Migratory Fishery. The creek has several bridges crossing it.

== Course ==
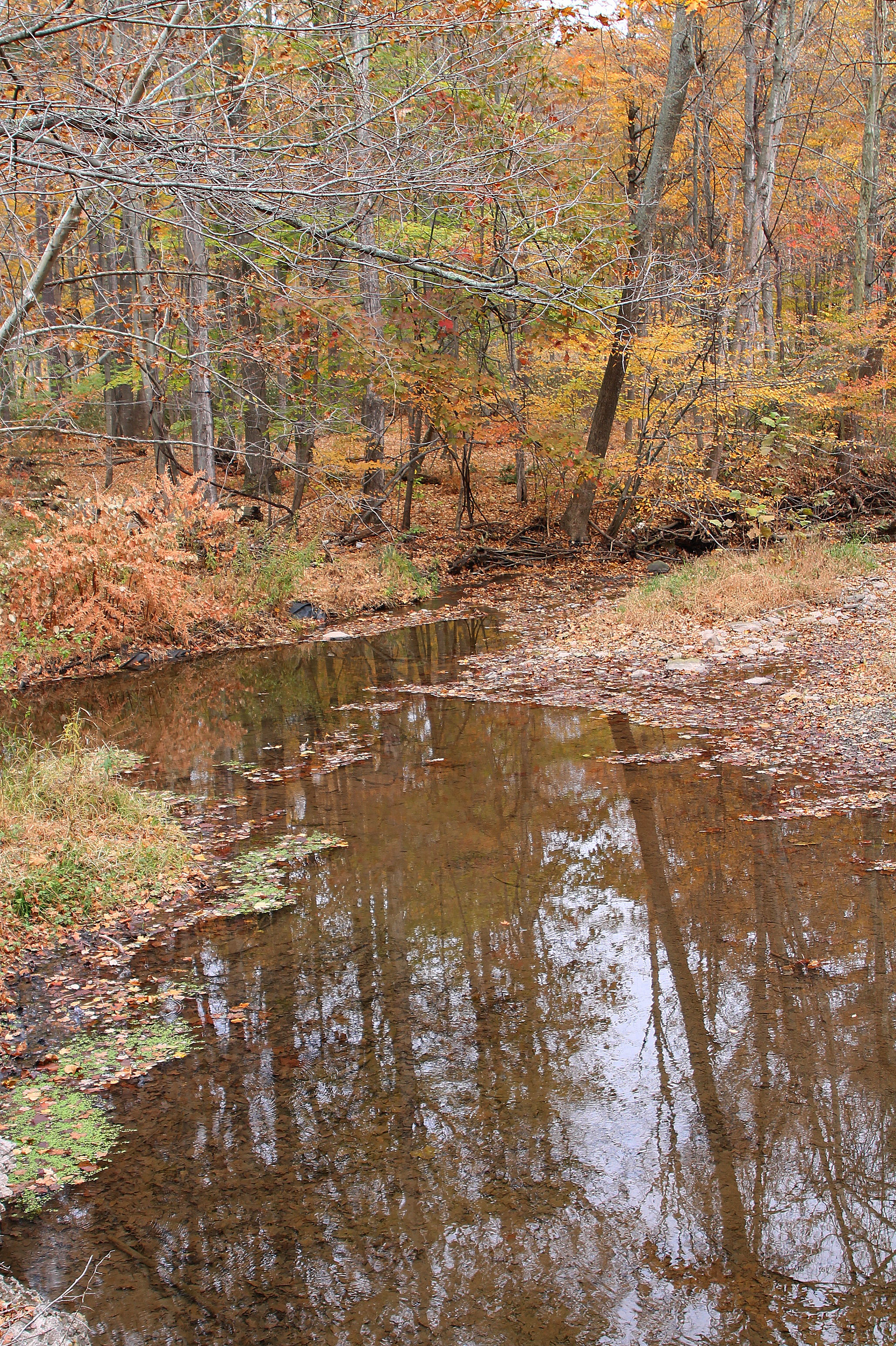
Marsh Creek looking downstream from Jenks Road

Marsh Creek begins at the base of a ridge in Northmoreland Township. It flows northeast for a short distance before turning north for more than a mile and passing through a large wetland. The creek then turns northwest for a few tenths of a mile before turning north for a few tenths of a mile and crossing Pennsylvania Route 292. At this point, it turns west-northwest for several tenths of a mile before crossing Pennsylvania Route 292 again, passing through Eaton Township, and receiving Sugar Run, its only named tributary, from the left. For almost all of the rest of its length, it flows along the border of Eaton Township and Monroe Township. The creek then turns north-northwest for several tenths of a mile, crossing Pennsylvania Route 292 for a third time. It then turns west for several tenths of a mile as its valley narrows. The creek then turns north for several tenths of a mile before turning northeast for several tenths of a mile and reaching its confluence with Bowman Creek.

Marsh Creek joins Bowman Creek 5.60 miles (9.01 km) upstream of its mouth.

=== Tributaries ===
Marsh Creek has one named tributary, which is known as Sugar Run. It joins Marsh Creek 2.24 miles (3.60 km) upstream of its mouth and its watershed has an area of 1.36 square miles (3.5 km^{2}).

== Hydrology ==
Marsh Creek is not designated as an impaired waterbody.

== Geography and geology ==
The elevation near the mouth of Marsh Creek is 712 feet (217 m) above sea level. The elevation of the creek's source is between 1,160 and 1,180 feet (354 and 360 m) above sea level.

Marsh Creek is a very small stream; it has been described as "tiny". At the point where the creek meets Bowman Creek, there is a deep pool of water on the latter creek, known as Barn Pool.

The surficial geology in the vicinity of the mouth of Marsh Creek consists of alluvium and Wisconsinan Ice-Contact Stratified Drift. Further upstream, the surficial geology consists of Wisconsinan Till and bedrock consisting of sandstone and shale, though there are some patches of alluvium, Wisconsinan Ice-Contact Stratified Drift, and wetlands.

== Watershed ==
The watershed of Marsh Creek has an area of 10.2 square miles (26 km^{2}). The creek is entirely within the United States Geological Survey quadrangle of Center Moreland.

Marsh Creek is one of the major tributaries of Bowman Creek.

Some residential and/or commercial land infringes upon the 100-year floodplain of Marsh Creek and its tributaries. A road known as Jenks Road crosses the creek at its mouth.

== History ==
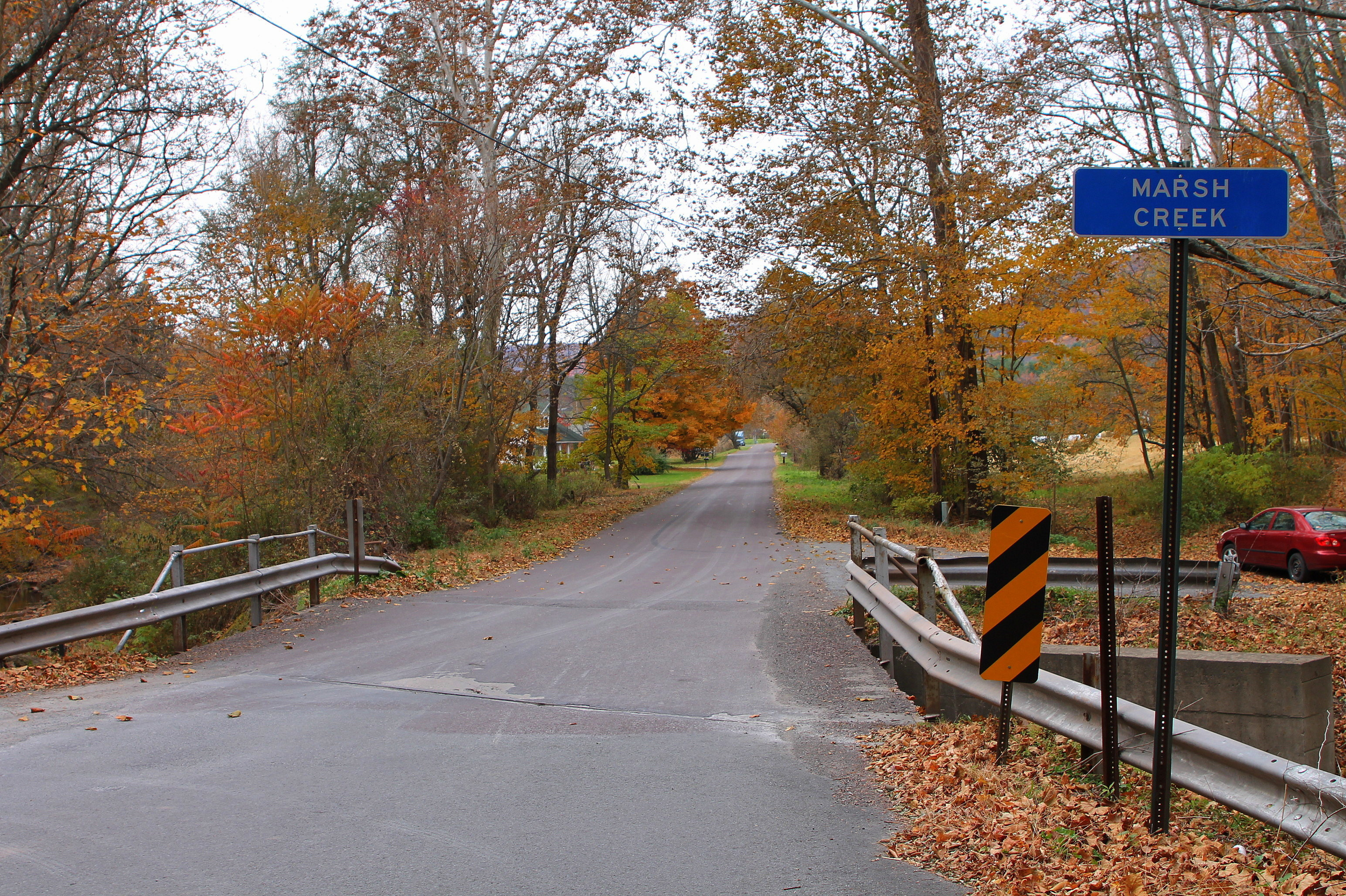
Bridge carrying Jenks Road over Marsh Creek

Marsh Creek was entered into the Geographic Names Information System on August 2, 1979. Its identifier in the Geographic Names Information System is 1199111.

A steel stringer/multi-beam or girder bridge carrying T-338/Jenks Road over Marsh Creek was built in 1920 and repaired in 1982. It is 2.5 miles (4.0 km) northwest of Vernon and is 26.9 feet (8.2 m) long. A concrete culvert bridge carrying Pennsylvania Route 292 was built over the creek in 1955 in Northmoreland Township and is 27.9 feet (8.5 m) long. A steel stringer/multi-beam or girder bridge carrying Pennsylvania Route 292 was constructed across the creek in 1955 in Northmoreland Township and is 38.1 feet (11.6 m) long. Another steel stringer/multi-beam or girder bridge carrying Pennsylvania Route 292 over the creek was built in 1955 at the Monroe Township/Eaton Township line and is 33.1 feet (10.1 m) long.

== Biology ==
The drainage basin of Marsh Creek is designated as a High-Quality Coldwater Fishery and a Migratory Fishery. Wild trout naturally reproduce in the creek from its headwaters downstream to its mouth.

== See also ==
- Sugar Hollow Creek, next tributary of Bowman Creek going downstream
- Roaring Run (Bowman Creek), next tributary of Bowman Creek going upstream
- List of rivers of Pennsylvania
- List of tributaries of Bowman Creek
