= Marsh Creek (Missouri) =

Stream in the U.S. state of Missouri

Marsh Creek is a stream in Madison County in the U.S. state of Missouri. It is a tributary of the St. Francis River.

The stream headwaters are at 37°25′11″N 90°30′56″W at an elevation of about 860 feet. It flows east to southeast passing north of Stumbeaugh Mountain to its confluence with the St. Francis at 37°24′36″N 90°27′58″W at an elevation of 499 feet. Rock Pile Mountain lies just to the east of the confluence across the St. Francis. The historic community of Marsh Creek lies on the west bank of the St. Francis one half mile north of the confluence.

Marsh Creek derives its name from Charles S. Marsh, an early settler.

== See also ==
- List of rivers of Missouri
