= Marsh Motorcycle Company =

Defunct American motor vehicle manufacturer

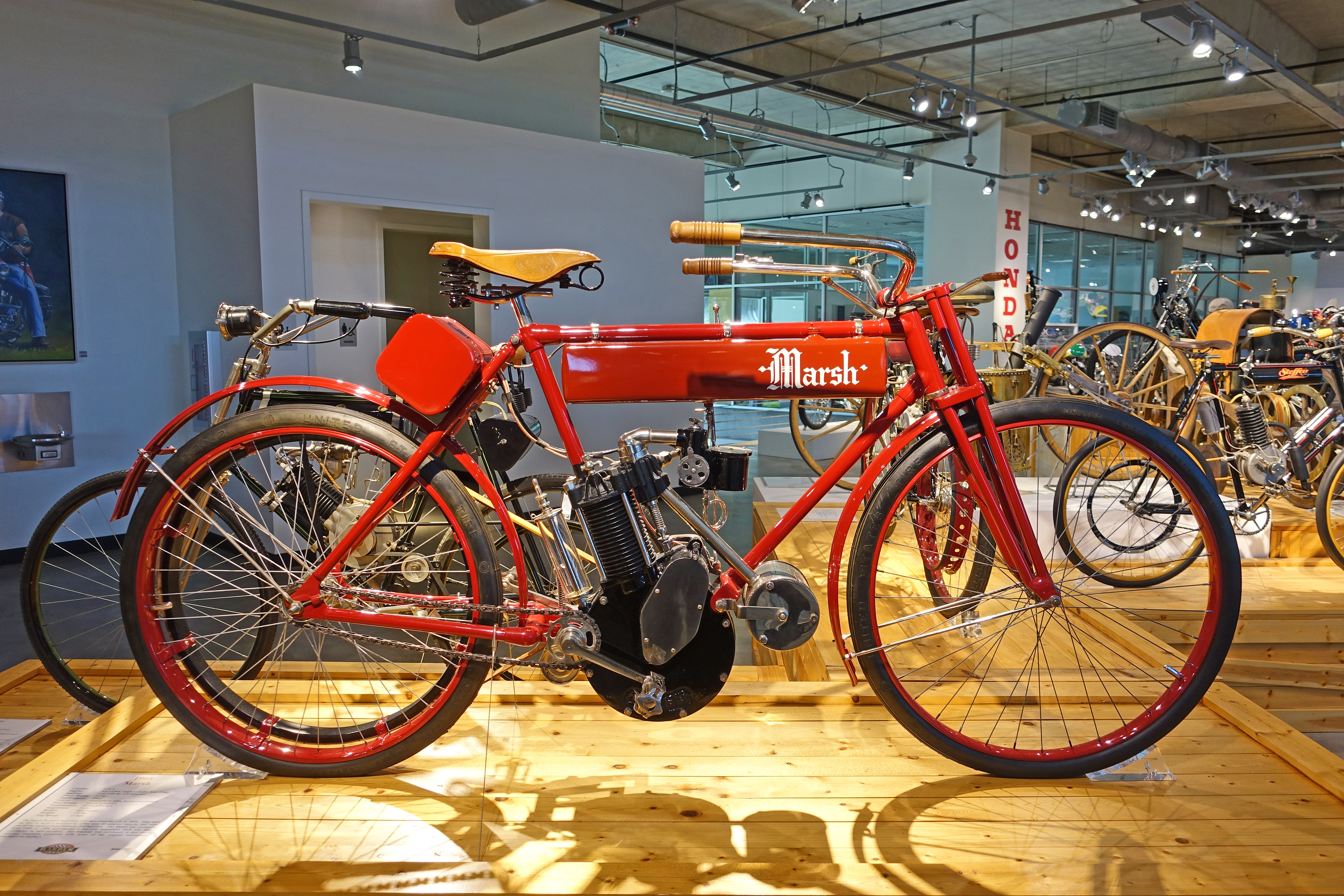
1905 Marsh on display at the Barber Vintage Motorsports Museum, Birmingham, Alabama. The single-cylinder motorcycle had a displacement of 290cc, weighed 130 pounds, and had a top speed of 35 mph.

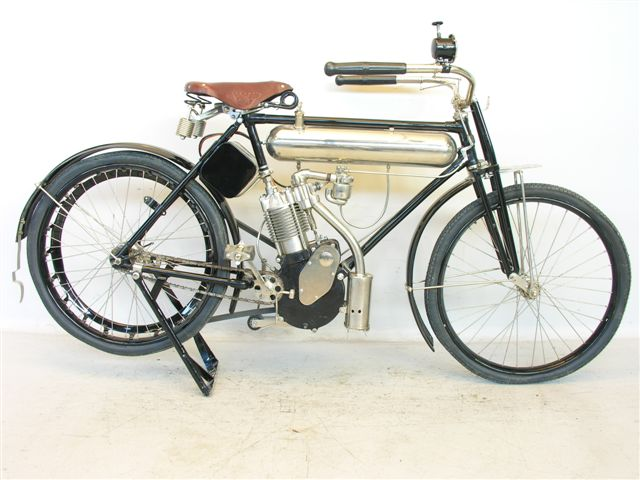
1907 Marsh-Metz 500 cc motorcycle

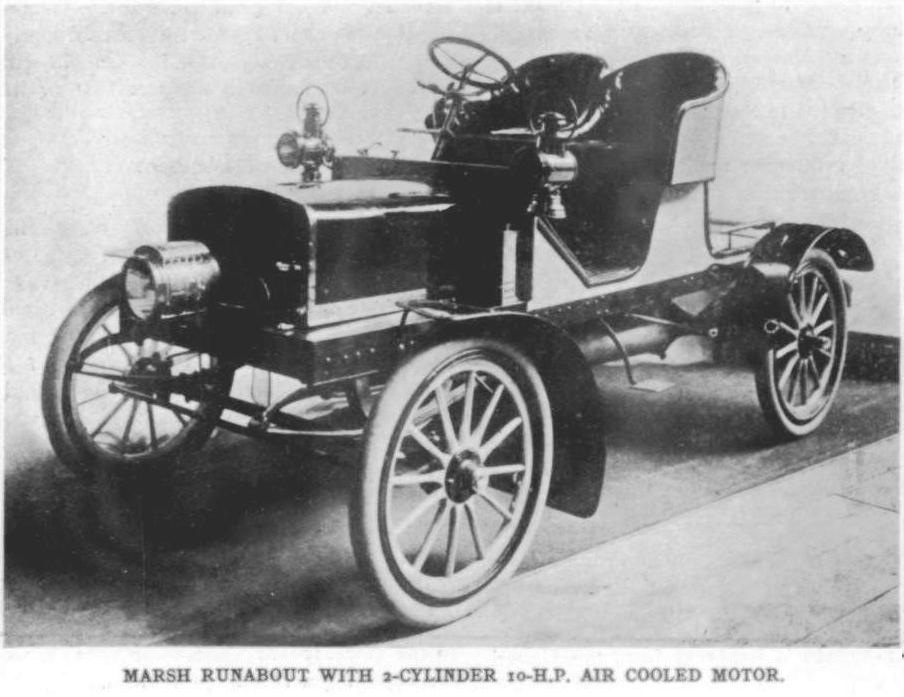
Marsh 10 HP Runabout (1905)

The Marsh Motorcycle Company is a veteran era American motorcycle maker founded in Brockton, Massachusetts.

The company was formed by the Marsh brothers in Brockton in 1899. In 1905, it was combined with Charles Metz's Metz Motorcycle Company to create the American Motorcycle Company.

The Marsh brothers also created the Marsh Motor Carriage Company in 1899. Steam and gasoline runabouts were built on a limited basis.

== Sources ==
- Mirco de Cet: Illustrated Directory of Motorcycles, Motorbooks International (Dec., 2002), ISBN 978-0-76031-417-3 ISBN 0-76031-417-9 (soft cover)
