= Marsh River =

Marsh River may refer to:

- Marsh River (Maine), a tributary of the Sheepscot River
- Marsh River (Minnesota), a tributary of the Red River of the North
