= Bell Bend Nuclear Power Plant =

Nuclear power plant in Luzerne County, Pennsylvania

Bell Bend Nuclear Power Plant (proposed, cancelled)
- Country: United States
- Location: Salem Township, Luzerne County, Pennsylvania
- Coordinates: 41°5′N 76°9′W
- Status: Cancelled
- Operators: PP&L

Nuclear power station
- Reactor type: PWR
- Reactor supplier: AREVA

Power generation
- Units cancelled: 1 × 1600 MW US EPR

The Bell Bend Nuclear Power Plant was a proposed nuclear power plant, which would have been built on the Bell Bend of the Susquehanna River in Luzerne County, Pennsylvania adjacent to the Susquehanna Steam Electric Station.

On October 10, 2008, PPL Bell Bend, LLC, a subsidiary of PPL submitted a Combined Construction and Operating License application (COL) for the plant with the Nuclear Regulatory Commission (NRC) — in time for the potential plant to qualify for production tax credits under the U.S. Energy Policy Act of 2005.

The proposed nuclear power plant consisted of one European Pressurized Reactor (EPR) steam electric system designed by the French company AREVA. The rated core thermal power would be 4,590 MWt. The rated and design net electrical output was approximately 1,600 MWe. A total of four plants using this technology were under construction in 2008 in Finland, France, and China. The two units at Taishan nuclear power plant have since entered commercial operations while Olkiluoto 3 (the first EPR to start construction) reached first criticality in late 2021 whereas Flamanville 3 is still not finished as of 2022. The plant would have been built by PPL and UniStar Nuclear Energy, a joint enterprise of Constellation and French energy giant EDF.

PPL spokesman Dan McCarthy said in 2008 that the plant would cost about $10 billion to develop, and seven to eight years to construct — beginning operation in 2016 or 2017. A 2011 estimate gave costs as $13–15 billion and an operational starting date of 2018-20. PPL filed an initial application for federal loan guarantees by the September 29, 2008 deadline. PPL intended to submit the second part of the application by the December 19 deadline. PPL Chief Operating Officer William Spence said, "Without federal loan guarantees, companies like PPL will not be able to secure financing for the substantial cost of building new, advanced-design nuclear energy plants that will help this country achieve challenging limits on carbon dioxide emissions, as well as energy independence".

The license application was withdrawn on August 31, 2016.
