= Barnes Brook =

Physical characteristics
- Source
  - location: atop Bartlett Mountain in North Branch Township, Pennsylvania
  - elevation: 2,134 ft (650 m)
- Mouth
  - location: North Branch Mehoopany Creek in Colley Township, Sullivan County, Pennsylvania near Lovelton
  - coordinates: 41°31′11″N 76°14′05″W
  - elevation: 1,171 ft (357 m)
- Length: 1.8 mi (2.9 km)
- Basin size: 1.98 sq mi (5.1 km^{2})

Basin features
- Progression: North Branch Mehoopany Creek → Mehoopany Creek → Susquehanna River → Chesapeake Bay
- Tributaries
  - left: Coffee Brook

Barnes Brook is a tributary of North Branch Mehoopany Creek in Wyoming County and Sullivan County, in Pennsylvania, in the United States. It is approximately 1.8 miles (2.9 km) long and flows through North Branch Township in Wyoming County and Colley Township in Sullivan County. The watershed of the stream has an area of 1.98 square miles (5.1 km^{2}). It is a high-gradient stream that flows mainly through forested lands, and has one named tributary.

== Course ==
Barnes Brook begins atop Bartlett Mountain in North Branch Township, Wyoming County. It flows west-southwest for a few tenths of a mile before turning northwest and beginning to quickly descend the mountain into a deep valley. After several tenths of a mile, the stream enters Colley Township, Sullivan County and receives its only named tributary, Coffee Brook, from the left. The stream then turns north for several tenths of a mile before turning north-northwest for a few tenths of a mile. It then exits the valley and reaches its confluence with North Branch Mehoopany Creek.

Barnes Brook joins North Branch Mehoopany Creek 7.12 miles (11.46 km) upstream of its mouth.

=== Tributaries ===
Barnes Brook has one named tributary, which is known as Coffee Brook. Coffee Brook joins Barnes Brook 0.84 miles (1.35 km) upstream of its mouth and drains an area of 0.86 square miles (2.2 km^{2}).

== Hydrology, geography, and geology ==
The elevation near the mouth of Barnes Brook is 1,171 feet (357 m) above sea level. The elevation near the stream's source is 2,134 feet (650 m) above sea level.

Barnes Brook is a high-gradient stream, falling at a rate of 102.1 meters per kilometer (539 ft/mi). This is the second-highest gradient of any named direct tributary of North Branch Mehoopany Creek, after Catlin Brook. It flows in a generally northwesterly direction. Mountains in the watershed of the stream include Bartlett Mountain and Briskey Mountain, the latter of which is where its headwaters are.

In an August 2001 study by the Pennsylvania Fish and Boat Commission, Barnes Brook was found to be entirely dry, except for a number of stagnant pools. When the ambient air temperature was 25.0 °C (77.0 °F), the water temperature at the stream's mouth was found to be 17.8 °C (64.0 °F). The pH of the stream at its mouth was 6.6 and the alkalinity was 40 milligrams per liter (0.040 oz/cu ft). The water hardness was 48 milligrams per liter (0.048 oz/cu ft) and the specific conductance was 111 umhos.

== Watershed and biology ==
The watershed of Barnes Brook has an area of 1.98 square miles (5.1 km^{2}). The stream is entirely within the United States Geological Survey quadrangle of Jenningsville. It joins North Branch Mehoopany Creek near Lovelton.

Only 4 percent of the length of Barnes Brook is within 100 meters (330 ft) of a road. However, 51 percent is within 300 meters (980 ft) of a road and 64 percent is within 500 meters (1,600 ft) of one. In 2000, the population density of the stream's watershed was 4 people per square kilometer (10 people per square mile). Most of the watershed is forested land and part of it is in Pennsylvania State Game Lands Number 57.

Barnes Brook is classified as a Coldwater Fishery. In 2001, the stream was found to lack fish habitats. However, the Pennsylvania Fish and Boat Commission will hold a meeting in January 2018 to consider adding the entire length of the stream, along with many other streams, to its list of wild trout streams.

== History ==
Barnes Brook was entered into the Geographic Names Information System on August 2, 1979. Its identifier in the Geographic Names Information System is 1168736.

Barnes Brook was visited in 2001 by Pennsylvania Fish and Boat Commission biologists, but unlike several streams in the North Branch Mehoopany Creek watershed, electrofishing did not occur, due to low stream flow.

== See also ==
- Sciota Brook, next tributary of North Branch Mehoopany Creek going downstream
- Smith Cabin Run, next tributary of North Branch Mehoopany Creek going upstream
- List of rivers of Pennsylvania
