= Farr Hollow =

Farr Hollow Farr Hollow Run

Physical characteristics
- Source
  - location: pond near Farr Hollow Road in Windham Township, Wyoming County, Pennsylvania
  - elevation: 1,158 ft (353 m)
- Mouth
  - location: North Branch Mehoopany Creek in North Branch Township, Wyoming County, Pennsylvania at Forkston
  - coordinates: 41°32′17″N 76°07′45″W
  - elevation: 781 ft (238 m)
- Length: 3.1 mi (5.0 km)
- Basin size: 2.99 mi^{2} (7.7 km^{2})
- Width
  - average: 0.6 m (2.0 ft)

Basin features
- Progression: North Branch Mehoopany Creek → Mehoopany Creek → Susquehanna River → Chesapeake Bay

Farr Hollow (also known as Farr Hollow Run) is a tributary of North Branch Mehoopany Creek in Wyoming County, Pennsylvania, in the United States. It is approximately 3.1 miles (5.0 km) long and flows through Windham Township and North Branch Township. The watershed of the stream has an area of 2.99 square miles (7.7 km^{2}). The stream is not designated as an impaired waterbody and flows through a mixture of forested and agricultural land. Eleven different fish species have been observed in the stream, including brook trout.

== Course ==
Farr Hollow begins in a pond near Farr Hollow Road in Windham Township. It flows southeast and then south for a few tenths of a mile before entering North Branch Township. Here, the stream flows south-southeast through a progressively narrowing valley between Douglas Hill and Cedar Hill. After a few miles, it reaches its confluence with North Branch Mehoopany Creek.

Farr Hollow joins North Branch Mehoopany Creek 0.50 miles (0.80 km) upstream of its mouth.

== Hydrology ==
Farr Hollow is not designated as an impaired waterbody.

In 2001, measurements of pH near the source and mouth of Farr Hollow were 7.4 and 7.0, respectively. Measurements of alkalinity were 66 and 72 milligrams per liter (0.066 and 0.072 oz/cu ft), with the higher value in the upper reaches. The total water hardness of the stream was 132 milligrams per liter (0.132 oz/cu ft) near the source and 84 milligrams per liter (0.084 oz/cu ft) near the mouth, while the specific conductance at these locations was 266 and 135 umhos, respectively. In August 2001, when the air temperature nearby was 28 °C (82 °F), the water temperature of the stream was 17.4 °C (63.3 °F) in its lower reaches and 19.1 °C (66.4 °F) in its upper reaches.

== Geography and geology ==
The elevation near the mouth of Far Hollow is 781 feet (238 m) above sea level. The elevation near the stream's source is 1,158 feet (353 m) above sea level.

Farr Hollow is a moderate-gradient stream (23.4 meters per kilometer (124 ft/mi)) whose source is in an unnamed pond. It has a width of 0.6 meters (2.0 ft), making it the narrowest tributary of North Branch Mehoopany Creek whose width has been measured. The stream flows in a generally southeasterly direction.

== Watershed ==
The watershed of Farr Hollow has an area of 2.99 square miles (7.7 km^{2}). The stream is entirely within the United States Geological Survey quadrangle of Jenningsville. It joins North Branch Mehoopany Creek at Forkston. The stream's designated use is for aquatic life.

The land in the vicinity of Farr Hollow includes a mixture of both forested and agricultural land. A total of 36 percent of the stream's length is within 100 meters (330 ft) of a road, while 57 percent is within 300 meters (980 ft) of one, and 85 percent is within 500 meters (1,600 ft). In 2000, the human population density of the stream's watershed was 5 people per square kilometer (13 people per square mile), giving it the second-highest population density of any tributary watershed of North Branch Mehoopany Creek.

== History ==
The valley of Farr Hollow was entered into the Geographic Names Information System on August 2, 1979. Its identifier in the Geographic Names Information System is 1174631. The stream Farr Hollow does not have an official name of its own and instead takes the name of the valley through which it flows. It is also known as Farr Hollow Run.

In the late 19th century, one of the five schools in what was then Forkston Township was located in Farr Hollow. A telephone line was constructed between Farr Hollow and Jenningsville in 1905.

Pennsylvania Fish and Boat Commission biologists performed a fish sampling and other studies on the streams in the North Branch Mehoopany Creek watershed, including Farr Hollow, in 2001. Two locations were part of the study, one 0.14 miles (0.23 km) upstream of the mouth and another 3.00 miles (4.83 km) upstream of the mouth. In 2016, the Mehoopany Creek Watershed Association requested that the Pennsylvania Department of Environmental Protection undertake an evaluation of Farr Hollow, along with North Branch Mehoopany Creek and Little Mehoopany Creek.

== Biology ==
Wild trout naturally reproduce in Farr Hollow from its headwaters downstream to its mouth. The stream is classified as a Coldwater Fishery. However, in 2001, these wild brook trout populations were noted to be sparse.

In the 2001 study by the Pennsylvania Fish and Boat Commission, a total of 11 fish species were observed by electrofishing in the lower reaches of Farr Hollow. Three wild brook trout were observed, with lengths ranging from 125 to 174 millimeters (4.9 to 6.9 in), along with one hatchery brook trout stocked by local landowners. The low trout populations were primarily due to difficulty for fish to physically access the stream.

Other fish species observed in Farr Hollow in the 2001 study include central stonerollers, common shiners and golden shiners, blacknose dace and longnose dace, creek chub, white sucker, brown bullhead, pumpkinseed, and sculpins.

== See also ==
- Douglas Hollow, next tributary of North Branch Mehoopany Creek going upstream
- List of rivers of Pennsylvania
