= Coffee Brook =

Stream in Pennsylvania, United States

Physical characteristics
- Source
  - location: Crane Swamp between Briskey Mountain and Bartlett Mountain in North Branch Township, Wyoming County, Pennsylvania
  - elevation: 2,244 ft (684 m)
- Mouth
  - location: Barnes Brook in Colley Township, Sullivan County, Pennsylvania near Lovelton
  - coordinates: 41°30′32″N 76°13′55″W
  - elevation: 1,414 ft (431 m)
- Length: 1.1 mi (1.8 km)
- Basin size: 0.86 sq mi (2.2 km^{2})

Basin features
- Progression: Barnes Brook → North Branch Mehoopany Creek → Mehoopany Creek → Susquehanna River → Chesapeake Bay

Coffee Brook is a tributary of Barnes Brook in Wyoming County and Sullivan County, in Pennsylvania, in the United States. It is approximately 1.1 miles (1.8 km) long and flows through North Branch Township in Wyoming County and Colley Township in Sullivan County. The watershed of the stream has an area of 0.86 square miles (2.2 km^{2}). The stream itself has a high gradient and primarily flows through forested lands. Access is difficult due to a lack of nearby roads and extensive private property signs in the area.

== Course ==
Coffee Brook begins in Crane Swamp between Bartlett Mountain and Briskey Mountain in North Branch Township, Wyoming County. It flows north-northwest for a few tenths of a mile before meandering west for a short distance, crossing into Colley Township, Sullivan County. Here, the stream turns north-northwest for a few tenths of a mile, entering a valley, before turning north-northeast. A few tenths of a mile further downstream, it turns north and reaches its confluence with Barnes Brook.

Coffee Brook joins Barnes Brook 0.84 miles (1.35 km) upstream of its mouth.

== Hydrology, geography and geology ==
The elevation near the mouth of Coffee Brook is 1,414 feet (431 m) above sea level. The elevation of the stream's source is 2,244 feet (684 m) above sea level.

Coffee Brook is a short, high-gradient stream, falling at a rate of 141.4 meters per kilometer (747 ft/mi). It flows in a generally northerly direction.

== Watershed and biology ==
The watershed of Coffee Brook has an area of 0.86 square miles (2.2 km^{2}). The mouth of the stream is in the United States Geological Survey quadrangle of Jenningsville. However, its source is in the quadrangle of Dutch Mountain. It joins Barnes Brook near Lovelton.

The watershed of Coffee Brook is mostly forested. It is difficult to access the stream, as no part of it is within 500 meters (1,600 ft) of a road and the area is mostly on heavily posted private property. In 2000, the population density of the watershed was 4 people per square kilometer (10 people/sq mi).

The headwaters of Coffee Brook are in Crane Swamp, near the border of Pennsylvania State Game Lands Number 57. Spruce trees were common around the swamp in the late 19th century, though in the early 20th century, extensive logging was done in the area. More recently, several hundred specimens of a shrub species that is rare in Pennsylvania have been observed in the swamp.

== History ==
Coffee Brook was entered into the Geographic Names Information System on August 2, 1979. Its identifier in the Geographic Names Information System is 1172127.

In 2001, Pennsylvania Fish and Boat Commission biologists attempted to visit Coffee Brook during a study of the North Branch Mehoopany Creek watershed, but were unable to find a way to reach the stream due to the extensive private property signs in the area.

== See also ==
- List of rivers of Pennsylvania
