= Douglas Hollow =

Douglas Hollow Douglas Hollow Brook

Physical characteristics
- Source
  - location: valley between Douglas Hill and Oak Ridge in North Branch Township, Pennsylvania
  - elevation: 1,307 ft (398 m)
- Mouth
  - location: North Branch Mehoopany Creek in North Branch Township, Pennsylvania near Lovelton
  - coordinates: 41°32′05″N 76°09′49″W
  - elevation: 892 ft (272 m)
- Length: 1.7 mi (2.7 km)
- Basin size: 1.57 mi^{2} (4.1 km^{2})
- Width
  - average: 0.9 m (3.0 ft)

Basin features
- Progression: North Branch Mehoopany Creek → Mehoopany Creek → Susquehanna River → Chesapeake Bay

Douglas Hollow is a tributary of North Branch Mehoopany Creek in Wyoming County, Pennsylvania, in the United States. It is approximately 1.7 miles (2.7 km) long and flows through North Branch Township. The watershed of the stream has an area of 1.57 square miles (4.1 km^{2}). The stream is classified as a Coldwater Fishery and is inhabited by four fish species, including wild brook trout. Its entire length is within 300 meters (980 ft) of a road, and it flows through a mixture of forested and agricultural land.

== Course ==
Douglas Hollow begins in a valley between Douglas Hill and Oak Ridge in North Branch Township. The stream passes through a small unnamed pond and flows south for several tenths of a mile before turning south-southeast for several tenths of a mile. It then turns south and crosses Pennsylvania Route 87 before reaching its confluence with North Branch Mehoopany Creek.

Douglas Hollow joins North Branch Mehoopany Creek 2.60 miles (4.18 km) upstream of its mouth.

== Hydrology ==
Douglas Hollow is not designated as an impaired waterbody.

At a site 0.06 miles (0.097 km) upstream of its mouth, Douglas Hollow was observed in 2001 to have a pH of 7.2 and an alkalinity concentration of 58 milligrams per liter (0.058 oz/cu ft). The water hardness was 74 milligrams per liter (0.074 oz/cu ft) and the specific conductance was 136 umhos. In a measurement in August 2001, when the air temperature nearby was 25.0 °C (77.0 °F), the water temperature in the stream's lower reaches was 17.1 °C (62.8 °F).

== Geography and geology ==
The elevation near the mouth of Douglas Hollow is 892 feet (272 m) above sea level. The elevation near the stream's source is 1,307 feet (398 m) above sea level.

Douglas Hollow is a high-gradient stream (60 meters per kilometer (320 ft/mi)) that flows in a generally southerly direction. The stream is 0.9 meters (3.0 ft) wide and in an August 2001 study was found to be dry or nearly dry in its lower reaches, with the exception of some small, disconnected pools.

== Watershed ==
The watershed of Douglas Hollow has an area of 1.57 square miles (4.1 km^{2}). The stream is entirely within the United States Geological Survey quadrangle of Jenningsville. It joins North Branch Mehoopany Creek near Lovelton.

Douglas Hollow flows through a mix of forested and agricultural lands. The non-forested land is mostly in the middle and upper reaches of the watershed. A total of 55 percent of the stream's length is within 100 meters (330 ft) of a road, while all of it is within 300 meters (980 ft) of one. The population density of the stream's watershed was 3 people per square kilometer (7.8 people per square mile) in 2000, putting it in a multi-way tie for the least densely populated sub-watershed of North Branch Mehoopany Creek.

== History ==
The valley of Douglas Hollow was entered into the Geographic Names Information System on August 2, 1979. Its identifier in the Geographic Names Information System is 1173421. The stream has no official name and instead takes its name from the valley through which it flows. It is also known as Douglas Hollow Brook.

Pennsylvania Fish and Boat Commission biologists performed a fish sampling and other studies on the streams in the North Branch Mehoopany Creek watershed, including one site on Douglas Hollow, in 2001. The stream was added to the Pennsylvania Fish and Boat Commission's list of wild trout streams in 2013.

== Biology ==
Wild trout naturally reproduce in Douglas Hollow from its headwaters downstream to its mouth. However, in 2001, these wild brook trout populations were noted to be sparse. In a 2001 study, two wild brook trout with lengths ranging from 75 to 149 millimeters (3.0 to 5.9 in) were observed in the stream's lower reaches. The low trout populations were primarily due to difficulty for fish to physically access the stream.

In addition to brook trout, three other fish species were observed in the lower reaches of Douglas Hollow: blacknose dace, creek chub, and sculpins.

Douglas Hollow is classified as a Coldwater Fishery.

== See also ==
- Farr Hollow, next tributary of North Branch Mehoopany Creek going downstream
- Burgess Brook, next tributary of North Branch Mehoopany Creek going upstream
- List of rivers of Pennsylvania
