= Wolf Run (North Branch Mehoopany Creek tributary) =

Physical characteristics
- Source
  - location: shallow valley near a wetland in Wilmot Township, Pennsylvania
  - elevation: 1,621 ft (494 m)
- Mouth
  - location: North Branch Mehoopany Creek in Colley Township, Sullivan County, Pennsylvania at Colley
  - coordinates: 41°31′51″N 76°17′02″W
  - elevation: 1,489 ft (454 m)
- Length: 3.2 mi (5.1 km)
- Basin size: 3.45 sq mi (8.9 km^{2})
- Width
  - average: 1.9 m (6.2 ft)

Basin features
- Progression: North Branch Mehoopany Creek → Mehoopany Creek → Susquehanna River → Chesapeake Bay
- Tributaries
  - left: one unnamed tributary

Wolf Run is a tributary of North Branch Mehoopany Creek in Bradford County and Sullivan County, in Pennsylvania, in the United States. It is approximately 3.2 miles (5.1 km) long and flows through Wilmot Township in Bradford County and Colley Township in Sullivan County. The stream's watershed has an area of 3.45 square miles (8.9 km^{2}), most of which is agricultural land and woodlots. In a 2001 study, seven species of fish were found in Wolf Run, but no gamefish. More recently, wild trout have been observed as well.

== Course ==
Wolf Run begins in a shallow valley near a wetland in Wilmot Township, Bradford County. It flows south-southeast for a few tenths of a mile before entering an unnamed lake. From the southern outlet of this lake, the stream flows south-southeast for more than a mile before entering Colley Township, Sullivan County, where it receives an unnamed tributary from the left. It then turns south-southwest for about a mile before crossing Pennsylvania Route 87 and reaching its confluence with North Branch Mehoopany Creek.

Wolf Run joins North Branch Mehoopany Creek 10.64 miles (17.12 km) upstream of its mouth.

== Hydrology ==
Wolf Run is not designated as an impaired waterbody.

In 2001, the pH of Wolf Run 0.73 miles (1.17 km) upstream of its mouth was measured to be 7.2, while the alkalinity was 38 milligrams per liter (0.038 oz/cu ft). The water hardness of the stream was 46 milligrams per liter (0.046 oz/cu ft) and the specific conductance was 60 umhos. When the ambient air temperature was 21.0 °C (69.8 °F), the water temperature was measured to be 17.0 °C (62.6 °F).

== Geography and geology ==
The elevation near the mouth of Wolf Run is 1,489 feet (454 m) above sea level. The elevation near the stream's source is 1,621 feet (494 m) above sea level.

Wolf Run is a low-gradient stream, falling at a rate of 13.1 meters per kilometer (69 ft/mi). The stream is 1.9 meters (6.2 ft) wide at a point 0.73 miles (1.17 km) upstream of its mouth. It flows in a generally southerly direction.

A mountain known as Tyler Mountain is located just to the east of Wolf Run.

== Watershed ==
The watershed of Wolf Run has an area of 3.45 square miles (8.9 km^{2}). The stream is entirely within the United States Geological Survey quadrangle of Colley. It joins North Branch Mehoopany Creek at Colley.

The main land uses in the watershed of Wolf Run are agricultural land and woodlots. A total of 18 percent of the stream's length is within 100 meters (330 ft) of a road, while 75 percent is within 300 meters (980 ft) of a road and 98 percent is within 500 meters (1,600 ft) of one. In 2000, the population density of the stream's watershed was 7 people per square kilometer (18 people per square mile), making it the most densely populated watershed of any named tributary of North Branch Mehoopany Creek.

== History ==
Wolf Run was entered into the Geographic Names Information System on August 2, 1979. Its identifier in the Geographic Names Information System is 1191677.

A concrete tee beam bridge carrying Pennsylvania Route 87 over Wolf Run was built in Sullivan County 1 mile (1.6 km) east of Colley in 1934. This bridge is 26.9 feet (8.2 m) long and has an average daily traffic rate of 657 vehicles as of November 2014.

In 2001, Pennsylvania Fish and Boat Commission biologists visited Wolf Run and performed a fish sampling, among other research. The stream was found to be too warm for wild trout and too narrow to qualify for the statewide trout stocking program.

== Biology ==
Wild trout naturally reproduce in Wolf Run from its headwaters downstream to its mouth. The stream is classified as a Coldwater Fishery.

However, in a 2001 study, no game fish were observed in Wolf Run, though seven other fish species were found. These species include central stoneroller, common shiner, blacknose dace, creek chub, white sucker, pumpkinseed, and tessellated darter.

== See also ==
- Smith Cabin Run, next tributary of North Branch Mehoopany Creek going downstream
- List of rivers of Pennsylvania
