= Catlin Brook =

Stream in Pennsylvania, United States

Physical characteristics
- Source
  - location: unnamed lake atop Bartlett Mountain in North Branch Township, Wyoming County, Pennsylvania
  - elevation: 2,260 ft (690 m)
- Mouth
  - location: North Branch Mehoopany Creek in North Branch Township, Wyoming County, Pennsylvania at Lovelton
  - coordinates: 41°31′42″N 76°12′20″W
  - elevation: 1,050 ft (320 m)
- Length: 1.5 mi (2.4 km)
- Basin size: 1.16 sq mi (3.0 km^{2})

Basin features
- Progression: North Branch Mehoopany Creek → Mehoopany Creek → Susquehanna River → Chesapeake Bay

Catlin Brook is a tributary of North Branch Mehoopany Creek in Wyoming County, Pennsylvania, in the United States. It is approximately 1.5 miles (2.4 km) long and flows through North Branch Township. The watershed of the stream has an area of 1.16 square miles (3.0 km^{2}). The stream itself is very small and steep, and is known for its extremely inaccessible waterfalls.

== Course ==
Catlin Brook begins in an unnamed lake atop Bartlett Mountain in North Branch Township. It flows in a northerly direction for a short distance before entering another unnamed lake. The stream then turns north-northeast for a few tenths of a mile, beginning to descend Bartlett Mountain. It then turns north for several tenths of a mile before crossing Devil's Elbow Road and reaching the bottom of the mountain. A few tenths of a mile further downstream, the stream reaches its confluence with North Branch Mehoopany Creek.

Catlin Brook joins North Branch Mehoopany Creek 5.27 miles (8.48 km) upstream of its mouth.

== Hydrology ==
Catlin Brook is not designated as an impaired waterbody. The stream has water for most of the year, but often dwindles to a trickle in the summertime. However, it was dry when Pennsylvania Fish and Boat Commission biologists visited it while studying the North Branch Mehoopany Creek watershed in the summer of 2001.

== Geography and geology ==
The elevation near the mouth of Catlin Brook is 1,050 feet (320 m) above sea level. The elevation near the stream's source is 2,260 feet (690 m) above sea level.

Catlin Brook is a very small and high-gradient stream, falling at a rate of 193.5 meters per kilometer (1,022 ft/mi). This makes it the highest-gradient named tributary of North Branch Mehoopany Creek.

Catlin Brook has a set of waterfalls known as the Catlin Brook Falls. These falls have been described in Jeff Mitchell's book Hiking the Endless Mountains as the "holy grail" of Pennsylvania waterfalls. Though they can be seen from Lovelton and are only 1 mile (1.6 km) from the nearest road, it is extremely difficult to access them; the area has been described by Mitchell as "insanely steep and rugged".

In addition to the many waterfalls, boulders and cliffs are also present along Catlin Brook. Additionally, columns of blue ice can form on the stream's waterfalls in the wintertime and persist until early May. The stream's headwaters are in a wet meadow, which can be a large, shallow pond when the water is high. The plateau at the headwaters has been described as having "a striking sense of isolation."

== Watershed and biology ==
The watershed of Catlin Brook has an area of 1.16 square miles (3.0 km^{2}). The stream is entirely within the United States Geological Survey quadrangle of Jenningsville. It joins North Branch Mehoopany Creek at Lovelton.

Catlin Brook primarily flows through forested land in a northerly direction. A total of 20 percent of the stream is within 100 meters (330 ft) of a road, while 46 percent is within 300 meters (980 ft) of a road and 52 percent is within 500 meters (1,600 ft) of one. In 2000, the population density of the watershed was 3 people per square kilometer (7.8 people/mi^{2}), putting it in a multi-way tie for the least densely populated sub-watershed of North Branch Mehoopany Creek.

Catlin Brook is classified as a Coldwater Fishery.

== History and recreation ==
Catlin Brook was entered into the Geographic Names Information System on August 2, 1979. Its identifier in the Geographic Names Information System is 1171345.

There are no known hiking trails that reach the glens of Catlin Brook. Despite this and the general difficulty of reaching the stream's falls, the Catlin Brook Falls are the subject of a section in Jeff Mitchell's Hiking the Endless Mountains due to their significance to waterfall enthusiasts in Pennsylvania. It is a 7-mile (11 km) hike that takes 5 to 8 hours. The upper reaches of the stream are in Pennsylvania State Game Lands Number 57.

The headwaters of Catlin Brook are also a suitable location for birdwatching.

== See also ==
- Miller Brook (North Branch Mehoopany Creek), next tributary of North Branch Mehoopany Creek going downstream
- Sciota Brook, next tributary of North Branch Mehoopany Creek going upstream
- List of rivers of Pennsylvania
- List of waterfalls
