= Sciota Brook =

Sciota Brook Scotch Run

Physical characteristics
- Source
  - location: unnamed pond in Wilmot Township, Pennsylvania
  - elevation: 1,322 ft (403 m)
- Mouth
  - location: North Branch Mehoopany Creek in North Branch Township, Pennsylvania at Lovelton
  - coordinates: 41°31′25″N 76°13′43″W
  - elevation: 1,119 ft (341 m)
- Length: 2.0 mi (3.2 km)
- Basin size: 3.23 mi^{2} (8.4 km^{2})

Basin features
- Progression: North Branch Mehoopany Creek → Mehoopany Creek → Susquehanna River → Chesapeake Bay
- Tributaries
  - right: one unnamed tributary

Sciota Brook (also known as Scotch Run) is a tributary of North Branch Mehoopany Creek in Bradford County, Sullivan County, and Wyoming County, in Pennsylvania, in the United States. It is approximately 2.0 miles (3.2 km) long and flows through Wilmot Township in Bradford County, Colley Township in Sullivan County, and North Branch Township in Wyoming County. The watershed of the stream has an area of 3.23 square miles (8.4 km^{2}). The stream itself is a moderate-gradient stream in an area consisting primarily of agricultural land and woodlots.

== Course ==
Sciota Brook begins in an unnamed pond in Wilmot Township, Bradford County. It flows south-southeast for several tenths of a mile in a valley between Round Top and Tyler Mountain, entering Colley Township, Sullivan County. The stream then receives an unnamed tributary from the right and continues flowing south and south-southeast. It eventually reaches the end of the valley and crosses Pennsylvania Route 87 before turning east. A few tenths of a mile further downstream, it crosses into North Branch Township, Wyoming County and just over the border, reaches its confluence with North Branch Mehoopany Creek.

Sciota Brook joins North Branch Mehoopany Creek 6.44 miles (10.36 km) upstream of its mouth.

== Hydrology ==
Sciota Brook is not designated as an impaired waterbody. In an August 2001 study, it was noted to have a low stream flow.

In its lower reaches, the pH of Sciota Brook was measured in the August 2001 study to be 7.2, while the alkalinity was 42 milligrams per liter (0.042 oz/cu ft). The water hardness was 60 milligrams per liter (0.060 oz/cu ft) and the specific conductance was 84 umhos. When the ambient air temperature was 25.0 °C (77.0 °F), the stream's water temperature was 17.8 °C (64.0 °F).

== Geography and geology ==
The elevation near the mouth of Sciota Brook is 1,119 feet (341 m) above sea level. The elevation of the stream's source is 1,322 feet (403 m) above sea level.

In its lower 2.2 kilometers (1.4 mi), Sciota Brook is a moderate-gradient stream, falling at a rate of 37.1 meters per kilometer (196 ft/mi). The primary hills in the stream's vicinity are Tyler Mountain and Round Top. Despite its length of only 2.0 miles (3.2 km), it flows through three counties.

== Watershed and biology ==
The watershed of Sciota Brook has an area of 3.23 square miles (8.4 km^{2}). The stream is entirely within the United States Geological Survey quadrangle of Jenningsville. It joins North Branch Mehoopany Creek near Lovelton.

The land use in the watershed of Sciota Brook is mainly agricultural land and woodlots. In its lower 2.2 kilometers (1.4 mi), a total of 39 percent of the stream's length is within 100 meters (330 ft) of a road, while 100 percent is within 300 meters (980 ft) of one. In 2000, the population density of the stream's watershed was 4 people per square kilometer (10 people/mi^{2}).

Sciota Brook is classified as a Coldwater Fishery.

== History ==
Sciota Brook was entered into the Geographic Names Information System on August 2, 1979. Its identifier in the Geographic Names Information System is 1187147. The stream is also known as Scotch Run. This variant name appears on some county highway maps published by the Pennsylvania Department of Transportation.

In 2012, Chesapeake Appalachia was issued a permit to build, operate, and maintain two 16-inch (41 cm) water pipelines and temporary mat bridges impacting one or more unnamed tributaries of Sciota Brook.

== See also ==
- Catlin Brook, next tributary of North Branch Mehoopany Creek going downstream
- Barnes Brook, next tributary of North Branch Mehoopany Creek going upstream
- List of rivers of Pennsylvania
