= Miller Brook (North Branch Mehoopany Creek tributary) =

Physical characteristics
- Source
  - location: near Pennsylvania Route 187 in North Branch Township, Pennsylvania
  - elevation: 1,229 ft (375 m)
- Mouth
  - location: North Branch Mehoopany Creek in North Branch Township, Pennsylvania at Lovelton
  - coordinates: 41°32′17″N 76°11′05″W
  - elevation: 965 ft (294 m)
- Length: 2.2 mi (3.5 km)
- Basin size: 3.86 sq mi (10.0 km^{2})
- Width
  - average: 2.5 m (8.2 ft)

Basin features
- Progression: North Branch Mehoopany Creek → Mehoopany Creek → Susquehanna River → Chesapeake Bay

Miller Brook is a tributary of North Branch Mehoopany Creek in Wyoming County, Pennsylvania, in the United States. It is approximately 2.2 miles (3.5 km) long and flows through North Branch Township. The watershed of the stream has an area of 3.86 square miles (10.0 km^{2}). The stream is not designated as an impaired waterbody. Wild trout naturally reproduce in the stream, and several other fish species have been observed.

== Course ==
Miller Brook begins near Pennsylvania Route 187 in North Branch Township, near the Wyoming County/Bradford County line. It flows south-southeast for a few tenths of a mile, crossing Pennsylvania Route 187, before turning south and receiving an unnamed tributary from the left. The stream continues flowing south for several tenths of a mile through a valley between Shingle Ridge and Oak Ridge. It then reaches a wetland and turns south-southeast, flowing between Oak Ridge and Round Top. Here, it receives an unnamed tributary from the right before leaving the valley and turning east-southeast for a few tenths of a mile. The stream then turns south and crosses Pennsylvania Route 87 before reaching its confluence with North Branch Mehoopany Creek.

Miller Brook joins North Branch Mehoopany Creek 3.94 miles (6.34 km) upstream of its mouth.

== Hydrology ==
Miller Brook is not designated as an impaired waterbody.

In 2001, the pH of Miller Brook near its mouth was measured to be 7.4, while the alkalinity was 64 milligrams per liter (0.064 oz/cu ft). The water hardness of the stream was 76 milligrams per liter (0.076 oz/cu ft) and the specific conductance was 146 umhos. When the nearby air temperature was 30.0 °C (86.0 °F), the water temperature was measured to be 20.6 °C (69.1 °F).

== Geography and geology ==
The elevation near the mouth of Miller Brook is 965 feet (294 m) above sea level. The elevation near the stream's source is 1,229 feet (375 m) above sea level.

Miller Brook is a low-gradient stream, with a gradient of 7.7 meters per kilometer (41 ft/mi) in its lower 2.4 kilometers (1.5 mi). The stream is 2.5 meters (8.2 ft) wide, making it the widest tributary of North Branch Mehoopany Creek with an officially measured width.

Miller Brook and its tributaries pass through gaps between several hills, including Oak Ridge, Round Top, and Shingle Ridge. A number of ponds and wetlands occur in the stream's watershed, and one of its tributaries extends into Bradford County.

== Watershed ==
The watershed of Miller Brook has an area of 3.86 square miles (10.0 km^{2}). The stream is entirely within the United States Geological Survey quadrangle of Jenningsville. It joins North Branch Mehoopany Creek at Lovelton.

Miller Brook flows through a mixture of both agricultural and forested land. In the stream's lower 2.4 kilometers (1.5 mi), 39 percent of the stream's length is within 100 meters (330 ft) of a road, while all of it is within 300 meters (980 ft) of one. In 2000, the population density of the stream's watershed was 3 people per square kilometer (7.8 people/sq mi), putting it in a multi-way tie for the least densely populated sub-watershed of North Branch Mehoopany Creek.

== History ==
Miller Brook was entered into the Geographic Names Information System on August 2, 1979. Its identifier in the Geographic Names Information System is 1181207.

A 33.1-foot (10.1 m) concrete tee beam bridge carrying Pennsylvania Route 87 was built over Miller Brook in 1932. A 34.1-foot (10.4 m) concrete tee beam bridge carrying State Route 4001 was built over the stream in 1958. A bridge replacement project for the Pennsylvania Route 87 bridge has been listed on a Pennsylvania Department of Transportation website.

Pennsylvania Fish and Boat Commission biologists performed a fish sampling and other studies on the streams in the North Branch Mehoopany Creek watershed, including Miller Brook, in 2001. The study found that the stream was too narrow to qualify for trout stocking and too warm to support wild trout.

== Biology ==
Wild trout naturally reproduce in Miller Brook. The stream is classified as a Coldwater Fishery.

In a 2001 study, eight fish species were observed in the lower reaches of Miller Brook, but the only gamefish was a single wild brook trout. Other fish species found in the stream include central stoneroller, common shiner, blacknose dace and longnose dace, creek chub, white sucker, and tesselated darter.

== See also ==
- Burgess Brook, next tributary of Miller Brook going downstream
- Catlin Brook, next tributary of Miller Brook going upstream
- List of rivers of Pennsylvania
