= Burgess Brook =

Physical characteristics
- Source
  - location: valley on the northern side of Bartlett Mountain in North Branch Township, Wyoming County, Pennsylvania
  - elevation: 1,489 ft (454 m)
- Mouth
  - location: North Branch Mehoopany Creek in North Branch Township, Wyoming County, Pennsylvania at Lovelton
  - coordinates: 41°32′01″N 76°10′07″W
  - elevation: 892 ft (272 m)
- Length: 1.2 mi (1.9 km)
- Basin size: 1.42 sq mi (3.7 km^{2})
- Width
  - average: 0.8 m (2.6 ft)

Basin features
- Progression: North Branch Mehoopany Creek → Mehoopany Creek → Susquehanna River → Chesapeake Bay

Burgess Brook is a tributary of North Branch Mehoopany Creek in Wyoming County, Pennsylvania, in the United States. It is approximately 1.2 miles (1.9 km) long and flows through North Branch Township. The watershed of the stream has an area of 1.42 square miles (3.7 km^{2}). The stream is narrow, with a high gradient, and is located in a remote area, mostly far away from any roads. It is designated as Class A Wild Trout Waters and has a large population of brook trout, as well as smaller numbers of brown trout. Three other fish species are also present in the stream.

== Course ==
Burgess Brook begins in a valley on the northern side of Bartlett Mountain in North Branch Township. The stream flows northeast for a few tenths of a mile before turning north-northeast for several tenths of a mile. It then flows north for several tenths of a mile, leaving the valley at the base of Bartlett Mountain before reaching its confluence with North Branch Mehoopany Creek.

Burgess Brook joins North Branch Mehoopany Creek 2.92 miles (4.70 km) upstream of its mouth.

== Hydrology, geography and geology ==
The elevation near the mouth of Burgess Brook is 892 feet (272 m) above sea level. The elevation near the stream's source is 1,489 feet (454 m) above sea level.

Burgess Brook is a high-gradient stream (90.6 meters per kilometer (478 ft/mi)) that flows in a generally northerly direction. It is also very narrow, with a width of 0.8 meters (2.6 ft) at its mouth.

The alkalinity at the mouth of Burgess Brook was measured in an August 2001 study to be 12 milligrams per liter (0.012 oz/cu ft), while the pH was 6.4. The water hardness was 12 milligrams per liter (0.012 oz/cu ft) and the specific conductance was 40 umhos. When the air temperature in the area was measured to be 26.0 °C (78.8 °F), the water temperature was 16.7 °C (62.1 °F).

== Watershed ==
The watershed of Burgess Brook has an area of 1.42 square miles (3.7 km^{2}). The stream is entirely within the United States Geological Survey quadrangle of Jenningsville. It joins North Branch Mehoopany Creek at Lovelton.

The source of Burgess Brook is in a remote area near the border of Pennsylvania State Game Lands Number 57. The area has been described as "a remote, natural and unspoiled environment". In 2000, the population density of the watershed was 3 people per square kilometer (7.8 people per square mile), putting it in a multi-way tie for the least densely populated sub-watershed of North Branch Mehoopany Creek. While the headwaters are largely forested, agricultural land does occur near the lower reaches of the stream.

No part of Burgess Brook is within 100 meters (330 ft) of a road. Only 9 percent of its length is within 300 meters (980 ft) of a road, and only 22 percent is within 500 meters (1,600 ft) of one. A total of 30 percent of the length of Burgess Brook is on public land.

== History and recreation ==
Burgess Brook was entered into the Geographic Names Information System on August 2, 1979. Its identifier in the Geographic Names Information System is 1170709.

In 2001, a Pennsylvania Fish and Boat Commission study suggested that Burgess Brook should be designated as Class A Wild Trout Waters. A representative of the Mehoopany Creek Watershed Association made a proposal in 2016 to re-designate Burgess Brook as a High-Quality Coldwater Fishery and Migratory Fishery.

Burgess Brook was noted in 2001 to be a poor site for angling.

== Biology ==
Wild trout naturally reproduce in Burgess Brook from its headwaters downstream to its mouth. It was added to the Pennsylvania Fish and Boat Commission's list of wild trout streams in 2013.

In a 2001 study by the Pennsylvania Fish and Boat Commission, five fish species were observed at the mouth of Burgess Brook, including wild brook trout and brown trout. These included 41 individual brook trout, ranging from 50 to 199 millimeters (2.0 to 7.8 in) long, and one brown trout, between 150 and 174 millimeters (5.9 and 6.9 in) long. The biomass of trout in the stream was 43.35 kilograms per hectare (38.68 lb/acre). Other fish species found in the stream include blacknose dace, longnose dace, and creek chub.

Burgess Brook is classified as a Coldwater Fishery. Despite this being its designated use, its existing use is High-Quality Coldwater Fishery. The stream is also designated as Class A Wild Trout Waters for brook trout from its headwaters downstream to its mouth.

== See also ==
- Douglas Hollow, next tributary of North Branch Mehoopany Creek going downstream
- Miller Brook (North Branch Mehoopany Creek), next tributary of North Branch Mehoopany Creek going upstream
- List of rivers of Pennsylvania
