= Smith Cabin Run =

Physical characteristics
- Source
  - location: unnamed pond in western Colley Township, Sullivan County, Pennsylvania
  - elevation: 2,192 ft (668 m)
- Mouth
  - location: North Branch Mehoopany Creek in Colley Township, Sullivan County, Pennsylvania at Colley
  - coordinates: 41°31′36″N 76°17′01″W
  - elevation: 1,460 ft (450 m)
- Length: 1.6 mi (2.6 km)
- Basin size: 1.45 mi^{2} (3.8 km^{2})

Basin features
- Progression: North Branch Mehoopany Creek → Mehoopany Creek → Susquehanna River → Chesapeake Bay
- Tributaries
  - right: two unnamed tributaries

Smith Cabin Run is a tributary of North Branch Mehoopany Creek in Sullivan County, Pennsylvania, in the United States. It is approximately 1.6 miles (2.6 km) long and flows through Colley Township. The watershed of the stream has an area of 1.45 square miles (3.8 km^{2}). The stream has a high gradient and flows primarily through forested land. It has an unnamed pond at its headwaters and a 20-foot (6.1 m) waterfall on an unnamed tributary.

== Course ==
Smith Cabin Run begins in an unnamed pond near the road T409 in western Colley Township, close to the Colley Township/Cherry Township line. It flows northeast for a short distance and enters a valley, where it flows east for a few tenths of a mile and then east-southeast. After several tenths of a mile, the stream's valley broadens and it receives two unnamed tributaries from the wikt:right bank. It then reaches the bottom of its valley and turns northeast, reaching its confluence with North Branch Mehoopany Creek.

Smith Cabin Run joins North Branch Mehoopany Creek 10.28 miles (16.54 km) upstream of its mouth.

== Hydrology ==
Smith Cabin Run is not designated as an impaired waterbody. In an August 2001 study, the stream was found to be dry except in a single pool. When the ambient air temperature was 21.0 °C (69.8 °F), the water temperature was measured to be 16.7 °C (62.1 °F).

In the August 2001 study, the pH of Smith Cabin Run 0.62 miles (1.00 km) upstream of its mouth was 7.0 and the alkalinity was 29 milligrams per liter (0.029 oz/cu ft). The water hardness was 41 milligrams per liter (0.041 oz/cu ft) and the specific conductance was 81 umhos.

== Geography and geology ==
The elevation near the mouth of Smith Cabin Run is 1,460 feet (450 m) above sea level. The elevation near the stream's source is 2,192 feet (668 m) above sea level.

Smith Cabin Run is a high-gradient stream, falling at a rate of 89.2 meters per kilometer (471 ft/mi). It flows in a generally easterly direction.

There is a waterfall on an unnamed tributary of Smith Cabin Run, approximately 600 feet (180 m) from the nearest road. The waterfall is approximately 20 feet (6.1 m) high and does not have a significant amount of flow except after heavy rain. The watershed also includes an unnamed pond and parts of Briskey Mountain.

== Watershed and biology ==
The watershed of Smith Cabin Run has an area of 1.45 square miles (3.8 km^{2}). The stream is entirely within the United States Geological Survey quadrangle of Colley. It joins North Branch Mehoopany Creek at Colley.

The watershed of Smith Cabin Run is primarily in forested regions. A total of 69 percent of the stream's length is within 100 meters (330 ft) of a road and all of it is within 300 meters (980 ft) of one. In 2000, the population density of the watershed was 4 people per square kilometer (10 people per square mile).

Wild trout naturally reproduce in the watershed of Smith Cabin Run from its headwaters downstream to its mouth. The stream is classified as a Coldwater Fishery.

== History and recreation ==
Smith Cabin Run was entered into the Geographic Names Information System on August 2, 1979. Its identifier in the Geographic Names Information System is 1187856.

Pennsylvania Fish and Boat Commission biologists visited Smith Cabin Run in August 2001 and found that there were no fish habitats there. However, in May 2014, the Pennsylvania Fish and Boat Commission held a meeting to determine whether to add Smith Cabin Run, among other streams, to their list of wild trout streams.

A portion of Pennsylvania State Game Lands Number 66 is in the watershed of Smith Cabin Run.

== See also ==
- Barnes Brook, next tributary of North Branch Mehoopany Creek going downstream
- Wolf Run (North Branch Mehoopany Creek), next tributary of North Branch Mehoopany Creek going upstream
- List of rivers of Pennsylvania
