= North Branch Bowman Creek =

Physical characteristics
- Source
  - location: wetland in Fairmount Township, Luzerne County, Pennsylvania
  - elevation: between 2,240 and 2,260 feet (683 and 689 m)
- Mouth
  - location: Bowman Creek at Mountain Springs in Ross Township, Luzerne County, Pennsylvania
  - coordinates: 41°20′26″N 76°13′14″W
  - elevation: 1,837 ft (560 m)
- Length: 3.2 mi (5.1 km)
- Basin size: 2.63 mi^{2} (6.8 km^{2})

Basin features
- Progression: Bowman Creek → Susquehanna River → Chesapeake Bay
- Tributaries
  - left: one unnamed tributary
  - right: one unnamed tributary

North Branch Bowman Creek is a tributary of Bowman Creek in Luzerne County, Pennsylvania, in the United States. It is approximately 3.2 miles (5.1 km) long and flows through Fairmount Township and Ross Township. The watershed of the creek has an area of 2.63 square miles (6.8 km^{2}). The creek is not designated as an impaired waterbody. The surficial geology in its vicinity includes Wisconsinan Till, alluvial fan, Boulder Colluvium, alluvium, bedrock, and a peat bog. The creek is mostly in Pennsylvania State Game Lands and Ricketts Glen State Park.

The drainage basin of North Branch Bowman Creek is designated as a High-Quality Coldwater Fishery and a Migratory Fishery. The creek has been stocked with fish in the past, but also has wild trout. There is a hiking trail that is located in its vicinity. An 11-acre (4.5 ha) natural lake is situated on the creek.

== Course ==
North Branch Bowman Creek begins in a wetland in Fairmount Township. It flows in a northeasterly direction for a few tenths of a mile before turning south-southeast for several tenths of a mile, entering Ross Township. Here, the creek turns southeast for a few tenths of a mile, passing through a wetland and receiving an unnamed tributary from the left. It then turns south-southwest for a few tenths of a mile before receiving an unnamed tributary from the right. The creek then turns south-southeast and enters a narrow valley before turning south. After several tenths of a mile, it turns southeast, leaving its valley. Several tenths of a mile further downstream, it meets South Branch Bowman Creek to form Bowman Creek.

North Branch Bowman Creek joins Bowman Creek 26.13 miles (42.05 km) upstream of its mouth.

== Hydrology ==
North Branch Bowman Creek is not designated as an impaired waterbody. However, in the 1980s, the creek was considered to be vulnerable to acidification.

== Geography and geology ==
The elevation near the mouth of North Branch Bowman Creek is 1,837 feet (560 m) above sea level. The elevation of the creek's source is between 2,240 and 2,260 feet (683 and 689 m) above sea level.

The surficial geology in the vicinity of the lower reaches of North Branch Bowman Creek consists of alluvial fan and alluvium. Further upstream, in the creek's valley, there is Boulder Colluvium, which is rich in boulders made of quartz, sandstone, or conglomerate. The valleys of North Branch Bowman Creek and South Branch Bowman Creek are the only places in the Sweet Valley quadrangle where this type of surficial geology occurs. Part of the creek's valley also has surficial geology of bedrock consisting of sandstone and shale, which occurs on the valley walls and part of the valley floor. Most of the rest of the surficial geology along the creek consists of a till known as Wisconsinan Till, but there are wetlands and peat bogs as well.

A talus deposit with sandstone boulders is located in the vicinity of North Branch Bowman Creek.

== Watershed ==
The watershed of North Branch Bowman Creek has an area of 2.63 square miles (6.8 km^{2}). The mouth of the creek is in the United States Geological Survey quadrangle of Sweet Valley. However, its source is in the quadrangle of Red Rock. The mouth of the stream is located at Mountain Springs.

A lake that was known as Bowmans Pond or Bean Pond in the early 1900s is situated on North Branch Bowman Creek. It is a natural lake with a surface area of 11 acres (4.5 ha).

For most of its length, North Branch Bowman Creek is either in Pennsylvania State Game Lands Number 57 or Ricketts Glen State Park. Its mouth is on land belonging to the Pennsylvania Fish and Boat Commission.

== History and recreation ==
North Branch Bowman Creek was entered into the Geographic Names Information System on August 2, 1979. Its identifier in the Geographic Names Information System is 1182526.

A hiking trail in Ricketts Glen State Park follows North Branch Bowman Creek for a short distance. A road known as Mountain Springs Road is also in the vicinity of the creek.

North Branch Bowman Creek has been stocked with trout in the past, though in 1984, it was said in The Morning Call that trout stocking was no longer being done there. The creek was stocked as early as 1952. In 1969, the creek was slated to be stocked with 350 brook trout. However, stocking of the creek was cancelled in 1978.

== Biology ==
The drainage basin of North Branch Bowman Creek is designated as a High-Quality Coldwater Fishery and a Migratory Fishery. Wild trout naturally reproduce in the creek from its headwaters downstream to its mouth.

== See also ==
- Bean Run, next tributary of Bowman Creek going downstream
- South Branch Bowman Creek
- List of rivers of Pennsylvania
- List of tributaries of Bowman Creek
