= Bean Run =

Physical characteristics
- Source
  - location: pond or small lake in Ross Township, Luzerne County, Pennsylvania
  - elevation: between 2,080 and 2,100 feet (634 and 640 m)
- Mouth
  - location: Bowman Creek at Mountain Springs in Ross Township, Luzerne County, Pennsylvania
  - coordinates: 41°21′01″N 76°12′17″W
  - elevation: 1,811 ft (552 m)
- Length: 1.3 mi (2.1 km)
- Basin size: 1.69 mi^{2} (4.4 km^{2})

Basin features
- Progression: Bowman Creek → Susquehanna River → Chesapeake Bay
- Tributaries
  - right: one unnamed tributary ("west branch of Bean Run")

Bean Run is a tributary of Bowman Creek in Luzerne County, Pennsylvania, in the United States. It is approximately 1.3 miles (2.1 km) long and flows through Ross Township. The watershed of the stream has an area of 1.69 square miles (4.4 km^{2}). The stream's watershed is designated as a High-Quality Coldwater Fishery and a Migratory Fishery.

== Course ==
Bean Run begins in a pond or small lake in Ross Township. It flows south-southeast for a few tenths of a mile, passing through another pond or small lake, and its valley narrows. The stream then turns south-southwest for several tenths of a mile as its valley deepens before receiving an unnamed tributary from the right. It then turns southeast for several tenths of a mile as its valley broadens. The stream then reaches its confluence with Bowman Creek.

Bean Run joins Bowman Creek 24.98 miles (40.20 km) upstream of its mouth.

=== Tributaries ===
Bean Run has no named tributaries, but it does have one unnamed tributary. This tributary is known as the west branch of Bean Run.

== Hydrology ==
Bean Run is not designated as an impaired waterbody.

== Geography and geology ==
The elevation near the mouth of Bean Run is 1,811 feet (552 m) above sea level. The elevation of the stream's source is between 2,080 and 2,100 feet (634 and 640 m) above sea level.

The surficial geology near the mouth of Bean Run consists of alluvium, Wisconsinan Ice-Contact Stratified Drift, and fill. Further upstream, there is mostly Wisconsinan Till, but also patches of Wisconsinan Bouldery Till and bedrock consisting of sandstone and shale.

== Watershed ==
The watershed of Bean Run has an area of 1.69 square miles (4.4 km^{2}). The stream is entirely within the United States Geological Survey quadrangle of Sweet Valley. Its mouth is located at Mountain Springs.

== History and recreation ==
Bean Run was entered into the Geographic Names Information System on August 2, 1979. Its identifier in the Geographic Names Information System is 1168847.

A portion of Pennsylvania State Game Lands Number 57 are in the watershed of Bean Run.

== Biology ==
The drainage basin of Bean Run is designated as a High-Quality Coldwater Fishery and a Migratory Fishery. Wild trout naturally reproduce in the stream from its headwaters downstream to its mouth.

There are artificial ponds located along an unnamed tributary to Bean Run. A number of wetland birds have been observed there.

== See also ==
- Wolf Run (Bowman Creek), next tributary of Bowman Creek going downstream
- South Branch Bowman Creek, next tributary of Bowman Creek going upstream
- North Branch Bowman Creek, next tributary of Bowman Creek going upstream
- List of rivers of Pennsylvania
- List of tributaries of Bowman Creek
