= North Branch Mehoopany Creek =

North Branch Mehoopany Creek North Fork Mehoopany Creek, North Branch Mehoppany Creek

Physical characteristics
- Source
  - location: Wilmot Township, Pennsylvania
  - elevation: 1,560 ft (480 m)
- Mouth
  - location: Mehoopany Creek in Forkston Township, Wyoming County, Pennsylvania near Forkston
  - coordinates: 41°32′03″N 76°07′23″W
  - elevation: 755 ft (230 m)
- Length: 14 mi (23 km)

Basin features
- Progression: Mehoopany Creek → Susquehanna River → Chesapeake Bay
- Tributaries
  - left: Wolf Run, Sciota Brook, Miller Brook, Douglas Hollow, Farr Hollow
  - right: Smith Cabin Run, Barnes Brook, Catlin Brook, Burgess Brook

North Branch Mehoopany Creek (also known as North Fork Mehoopany Creek or North Branch Mehoppany Creek) is a tributary of Mehoopany Creek in Bradford County, Sullivan County, and Wyoming County, in Pennsylvania, in the United States. It is approximately 14 miles (23 km) long and flows through Wilmot Township in Bradford County, Colley Township in Sullivan County, and North Branch Township and Forkston Township. The watershed of the creek has an area of 40.0 square miles (104 km^{2}). The creek has eight named direct tributaries, including hollows. In the 1940s and 1950s, the average discharge for September was found to be just 6.8 cubic feet per second (0.19 m^{3}/s), but was found to be over 100 cubic feet per second (2.8 m^{3}/s) for July and August.

North Branch Mehoopany Creek has a deep, narrow valley, with "rough and hilly" topography. The upper reaches of the creek's watershed contain swamps and small lakes. Although forested land is the most prevalent land use in the creek's watershed, agricultural land is also present. A number of bridges have been constructed over the creek. Its watershed is designated as a Coldwater Fishery and a Migratory Fishery. The creek has wild trout naturally reproducing within it.

== Course ==
North Branch Mehoopany Creek begins in Wilmot Township, Bradford County. It flows south for several tenths of a mile, flowing through an unnamed lake, before turning southwest and then south-southeast, entering Colley Township, Sullivan County and crossing Pennsylvania Route 87. After several tenths of a mile, the creek turns east-southeast for several tenths of a mile before receiving the tributary Wolf Run from the left. It then meanders south for a few tenths of a mile to receive the tributary Smith Cabin Run from the right. The creek then flows east, continuing to follow Pennsylvania Route 87. After more than a mile, it turns southeast and then east again for several tenths of a mile. It then turns northeast for several tenths of a mile, receiving the tributary Barnes Brook from the right and the tributary Scotia Brook from the left and turning east.

North Branch Mehoopany Creek then enters North Branch Township, Wyoming County and flows east-northeast for a few miles, still following Pennsylvania Route 87. It receives the tributary Miller Brook from the left and then turns east-southeast for more than a mile, receiving the tributaries Burgess Brook from the left and Douglas Hollow from the right. The creek then turns east-northeast and enters Forkston Township, where it turns east-northeast. After several tenths of a mile, it turns east for several tenths of a mile, receiving the tributary Farr Hollow from the left and turning south. A short distance further downstream, the creek reaches its confluence with Mehoopany Creek.

North Branch Mehoopany Creek is approximately 14 miles (23 km) long. The creek joins Mehoopany Creek 6.26 miles (10.07 km) upstream of its mouth.

== Hydrology and climate ==
Between 1942 and 1958, the average annual discharge of North Branch Mehoopany Creek near Lovelton ranged from 33.4 cubic feet per second (0.95 m^{3}/s) in 1954 to 67.8 cubic feet per second (1.92 m^{3}/s) in 1948. Between December 1940 and September 1958, the months of the year with the highest average discharge were April and March, with discharges of 108 and 102 cubic feet per second (3.1 and 2.9 m^{3}/s), respectively. The months of the year with the lowest average discharge were September and July, with discharges of 6.8 and 13 cubic feet per second (0.19 and 0.37 m^{3}/s). The highest average discharge for an individual month was 294.7 cubic feet per second (8.34 m^{3}/s), which occurred in April 1958. The lowest was 0.813 cubic feet per second (0.0230 m^{3}/s), which occurred in September 1941.

In the early 1900s, the average annual rate of precipitation in the watershed of North Branch Mehoopany Creek is 35 to 40 inches (89 to 102 cm).

== Geography and geology ==
The elevation near the mouth of North Branch Mehoopany Creek is 755 feet (230 m) above sea level. The elevation near the creek's source is 1,560 feet (480 m) above sea level.

The topography of the watershed of North Branch Mehoopany Creek has been described as "rough and hilly". The creek has a deep and narrow valley flanked by steep hills. In the early 1900s, the creek's valley was noted to be very fertile. Near the headwaters, there are swamps and small lakes. The creek has a channel that is sinuous and flows through rock formations consisting of sandstone and shale.

The bedrock in the watershed of North Branch Mehoopany Creek consists entirely of sandstone. The Arnot-Oquaga-Dystrochrepts soil association occurs between North Branch Mehoopany Creek and Mehoopany Creek. In the 2000s, accelerated erosion of streambanks and lateral shifting were identified at five locations on North Branch Mehoopany Creek. This was caused by man-made alterations after Tropical Storm Agnes in 1972 and other flooding events, as well as dredging in the creek. Remedying this would reduce the sediment load of Mehoopany Creek.

== Watershed ==
The watershed of North Branch Mehoopany Creek has an area of 40.0 square miles (104 km^{2}). The mouth of the creek is in the United States Geological Survey quadrangle of Forkston. However, its source is in the quadrangle of Meshoppen. The creek's mouth is located within 1 mile (1.6 km) of Forkston. There are 56.9 miles (91.6 km) of streams within the creek's watershed. The watershed of the creek occupies parts of Wyoming County, Sullivan County, and Bradford County.

There is a 65-acre (26 ha) pond known as Saxe Pond in the upper reaches of the watershed of North Branch Mehoopany Creek. The pond has a dam in Wilmot Township, Bradford County. Pennsylvania Route 87 runs alongside the creek for much of its length. There is a stream gage on the creek near Lovelton, at an elevation of 842.67 feet (256.85 m) above sea level. The creek drains an area of 35.2 square miles (91 km^{2}) at this point.

The main land use in the watershed of North Branch Mehoopany Creek is forested land, but there are significant areas of agricultural land as well. The watershed of the creek contains 10 drilled wells and another 14 permitted wells.

North Branch Mehoopany Creek is the largest tributary of Mehoopany Creek, forming approximately a third of the creek's watershed.

== History ==
North Branch Mehoopany Creek was entered into the Geographic Names Information System on August 2, 1979. Its identifier in the Geographic Names Information System is 1193036. The creek is also known as North Fork Mehoopany Creek and North Fork Mehoppany Creek. The latter variant name appears in a 1983 county highway map created by the Pennsylvania Department of Transportation. However, in 1969, civil engineer Ronald W. Hurs was unable to find any evidence that locals referred to the creek as "North Fork Mehoopany Creek". Deeds dating back to about 100 years before that all called the creek "North Branch Mehoopany Creek". North Branch Township probably takes its name from the creek.

The first road in North Branch Township, Wyoming County was built from Forkston up the valley of North Branch Mehoopany Creek. In the early 1900s, the main industry in the watershed of North Branch Mehoopany Creek was agriculture. Major communities in the creek's watershed at the time included Lovelton, with 136 people, and Colley, with 75 people. The creek was used as water power for a gristmill at Lovelton in the early 1900s.

A two-span prestressed box beam or girders bridge carrying State Route 3001 over North Branch Mehoopany Creek was built in Forkston Township, Wyoming County in 1987 and is 89.9 feet (27.4 m) long. A steel stinger/multi-beam or girder bridge carrying T-410 over the creek was built in Colley Township, Sullivan County in 1925 and is 33.1 feet (10.1 m) long.

In 1973, a 21-year-old man drowned in North Branch Mehoopany Creek.

When the Mehoopany and Little Mehoopany Creek Watershed Assessment was completed by Borton-Lawson in 2003, North Branch Mehoopany Creek was identified as "problem area" in need of restoration. However, by 2013, projects were being done to stabilize the banks of the creek. The Institute for Energy and Environmental Research was planning on installing a real-time continuous monitor on the creek, but flooding has made these plans uncertain.

== Biology ==
Wild trout naturally reproduce in North Branch Mehoopany Creek from its upper reaches downstream to its mouth. The drainage basin of the creek is designated as a Coldwater Fishery and a Migratory Fishery. A total of 25.0 miles (40.2 km) of streams in the creek's watershed are designated a Natural Trout Reproduction, while 10.8 miles (17.4 km) are Trout Stocked. In the 1980s, the creek was noted to be best for trout fishing in the early part of the season.

North Branch Mehoopany Creek is stocked with trout. In the 1980s, it was stocked with brook trout, brown trout, and rainbow trout. Stocking occurs in both Wyoming County and Sullivan County. In the 2000s, a total of 31 species of fish were observed in the creek, including darters, daces, suckers, and bluegills.

North Branch Mehoopany Creek is too small to support viable hellbender populations, even at its mouth.

== See also ==
- Rogers Hollow, next tributary of Mehoopany Creek going downstream
- Bowman Hollow, next tributary of Mehoopany Creek going upstream
- List of rivers of Pennsylvania
