= Newton Run =

River in Pennsylvania, United States

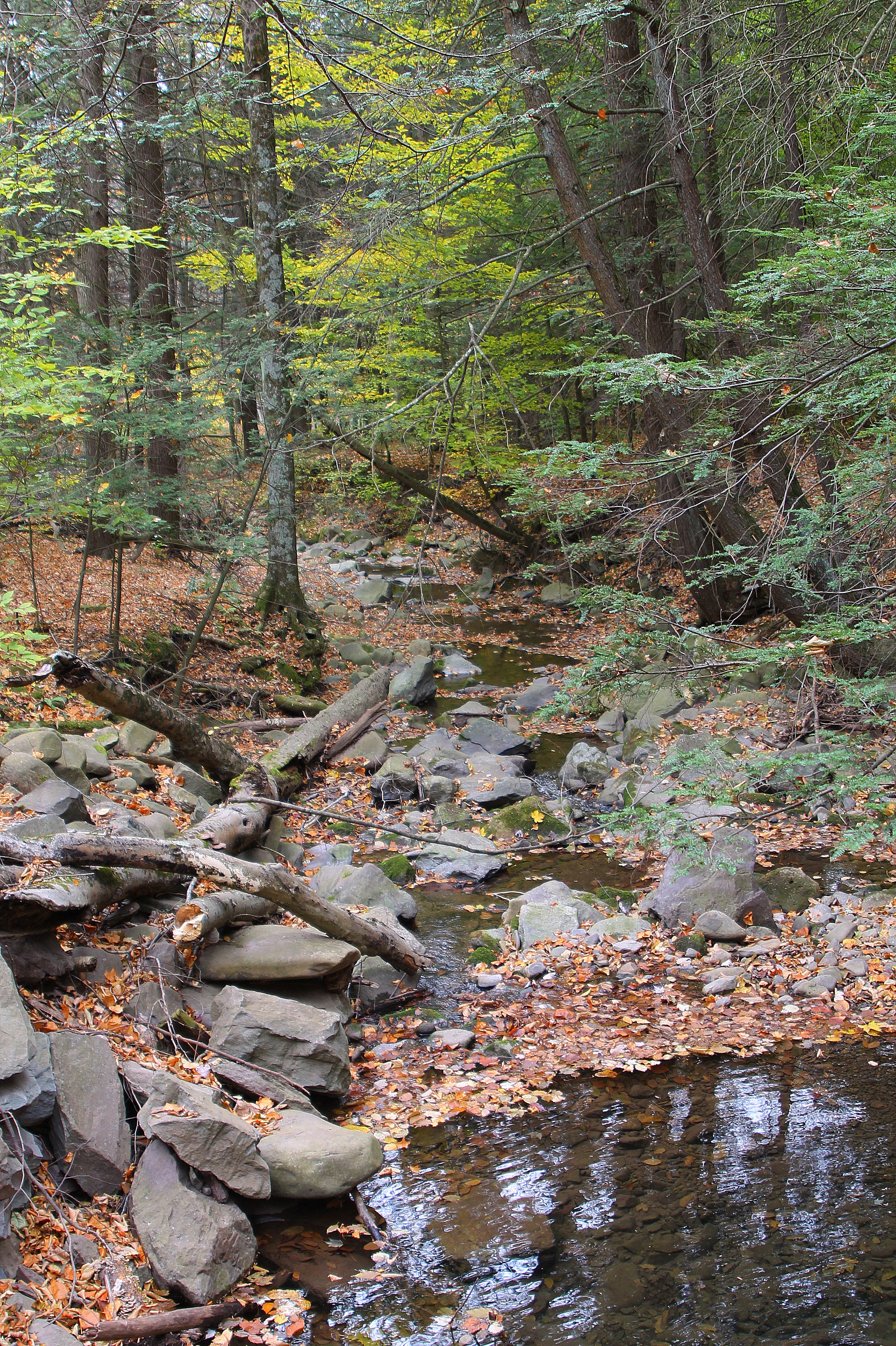
- Newton Run looking downstream from Root Hollow Lane

Physical characteristics
- Source
  - location: valley on the side of a hill in Eaton Township, Wyoming County, Pennsylvania
  - elevation: between 1,980 and 2,000 feet (604 and 610 m)
- Mouth
  - location: Roaring Run in Monroe Township, Wyoming County, Pennsylvania
  - coordinates: 41°27′42″N 76°01′53″W
  - elevation: 856 ft (261 m)
- Length: 2.7 mi (4.3 km)
- Basin size: 2.55 mi^{2} (6.6 km^{2})

Basin features
- Progression: Roaring Run → Bowman Creek → Susquehanna River → Chesapeake Bay

Newton Run is a tributary of Roaring Run in Wyoming County, Pennsylvania, in the United States. It is approximately 2.7 miles (4.3 km) long and flows through Eaton Township and Monroe Township. The watershed of the stream has an area of 2.55 square miles (6.6 km^{2}). The stream is not designated as an impaired waterbody. The surface geology in its vicinity consists of alluvium, alluvial fan, Wisconsinan Till, and bedrock.

== Course ==
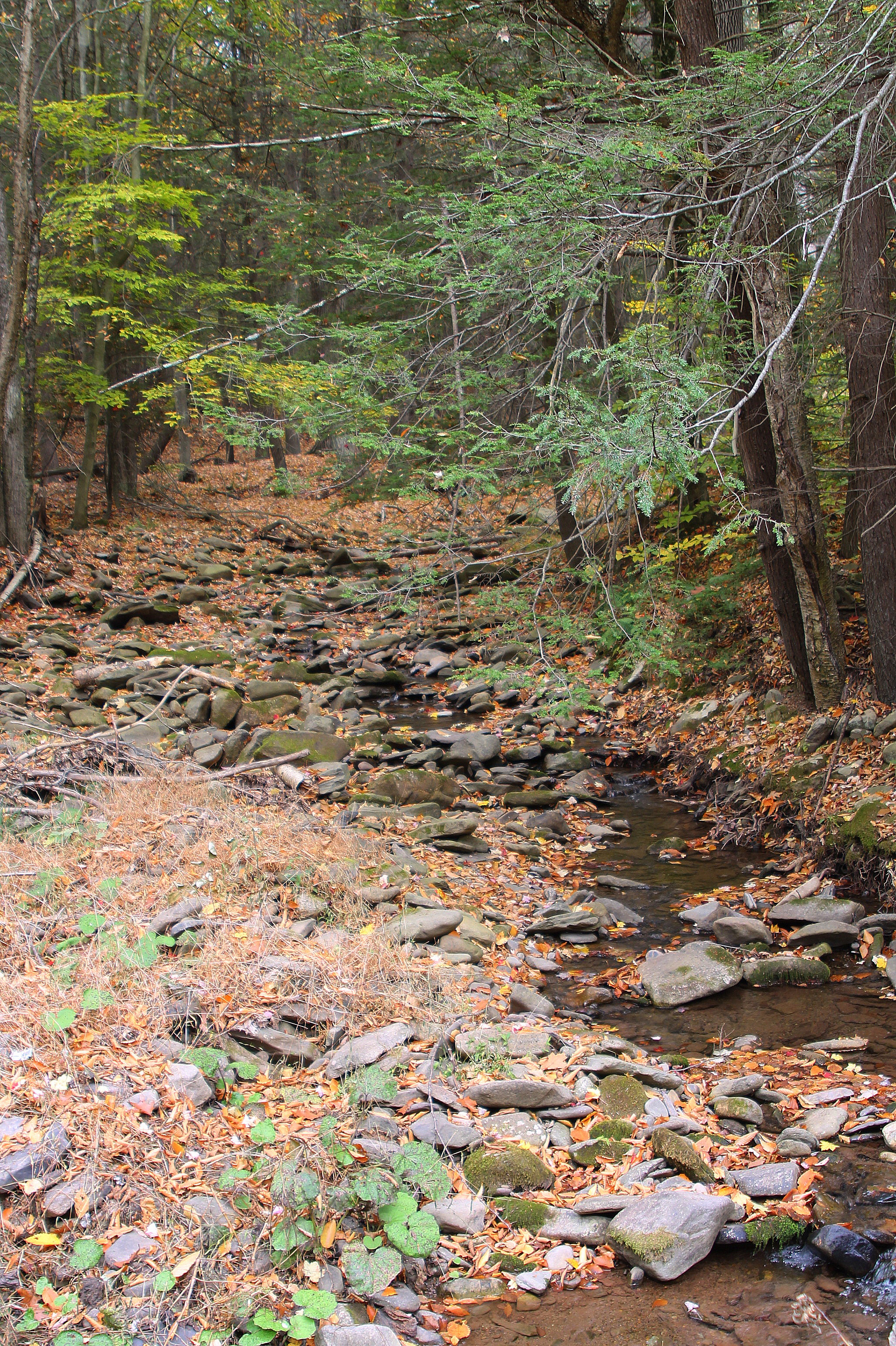
Newton Run looking upstream from Root Hollow Lane

Newton Run begins in a valley on the side of a hill in Eaton Township. It flows south-southeast for a short distance before turning south-southwest. After several tenths of a mile, the stream turns south before turning south-southwest again. After a few tenths of a mile, it turns south again and enters Monroe Township, where it turns south-southeast. A few tenths of a mile further downstream, the stream leaves its valley and turns southeast, running alongside Roaring Run for a few tenths of a mile before reaching its confluence with Roaring Run.

Newton Run joins Roaring Run 0.42 miles (0.68 km) upstream of its mouth.

== Hydrology ==
Newton Run is not designated as an impaired waterbody.

== Geography and geology ==
The elevation near the mouth of Newton Run is 856 feet (261 m) above sea level. The elevation of the stream's source is between 1,980 and 2,000 feet (604 and 610 m) above sea level.

The surficial geology along the lower reaches of Newton Run consists of alluvium. Further away from the stream, this is flanked Wisconsinan Till and a patch of alluvial fan. In the upper reaches, the surficial geology consists of Wisconsinan Till, and the valley sides have bedrock consisting of sandstone and shale.

== Watershed ==
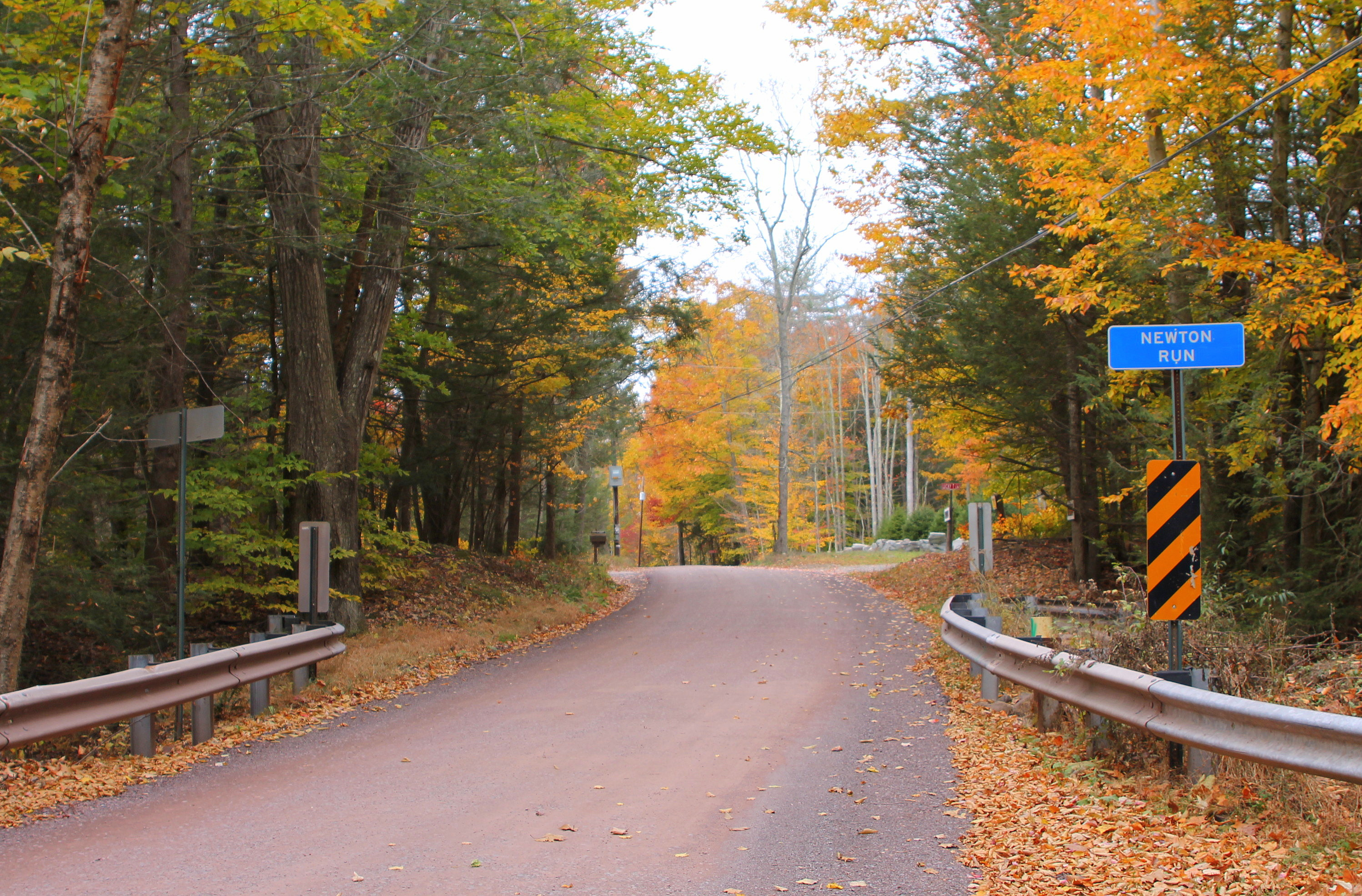
Root Hollow Lane crossing Newton Run

The watershed of Newton Run has an area of 2.55 square miles (6.6 km^{2}). The stream is entirely within the United States Geological Survey quadrangle of Noxen.

As of 2012, Chief Gathering LLC has a permit to construct and maintain a 24-inch (61 cm) natural gas pipeline and timber mat bridges crossing Newton Run and one of its unnamed tributaries.

== History ==
Newton Run was entered into the Geographic Names Information System on August 2, 1979. Its identifier in the Geographic Names Information System is 1199222.

In the 2000s, a wind farm in Wyoming County was proposed by BP Alternative Energy, but concerns about runoff from the wind farm were expressed. Newton Run was one of several streams in the project area.

== Biology ==
Wild trout naturally reproduce in Newton Run from its headwaters downstream to its mouth.

== See also ==
- South Branch Roaring Run, next tributary of Roaring Run going upstream
- List of rivers of Pennsylvania
- List of tributaries of Bowman Creek
