= Bowman Hollow =

Bowman Hollow Bowman Hollow Creek
- Etymology: the valley through which the stream flows

Physical characteristics
- Source
  - location: two unnamed tributaries in Forkston Township, Wyoming County, Pennsylvania
  - elevation: 1,205 feet (367 m)
- Mouth
  - location: Mehoopany Creek in Forkston Township, Wyoming County, Pennsylvania at Forkston
  - coordinates: 41°31′46″N 76°07′36″W
  - elevation: 797 feet (243 m)
- Length: 2.2 mi (3.5 km)

Basin features
- Progression: Mehoopany Creek → Susquehanna River → Chesapeake Bay

Bowman Hollow (also known as Bowman Hollow Creek) is a tributary of Mehoopany Creek in Wyoming County, Pennsylvania, in the United States. It is approximately 2.2 miles (3.5 km) long and flows through Forkston Township. The watershed of the stream has an area of 3.08 square miles (8.0 km^{2}). The stream flows over a highly secluded waterfall known as the Bowman Hollow Falls.

== Course ==
Bowman Hollow begins near the confluence of two unnamed tributaries in Forkston Township, Wyoming County. The stream flows northwest alongside a road and through a deep U-shaped valley for approximately two miles before reaching the end of the valley. It then enters the floodplain of Mehoopany Creek and turns north for a short distance before reaching its confluence with Mehoopany Creek.

Bowman Hollow joins Mehoopany Creek 6.68 miles (10.75 km) upstream of its mouth.

== Geography and geology ==
The elevation near the mouth of Bowman Hollow is 797 feet (243 m) above sea level. The elevation near the stream's source is 1,205 feet (367 m) above sea level. The stream is located within a U-shaped hollow and is surrounded on three sides by cliffs.

Bowman Hollow has a waterfall known as the Bowman Hollow Falls. The waterfall drops approximately 40 feet (12 m) into a large gorge and contains a number of cascades and flumes. It is an extremely obscure and secluded site and as such, is very rarely visited or photographed. The area has been described as being like a "secret garden". However, the waterfall is on private land.

== Hydrology and watershed ==
The watershed of Bowman Hollow has an area of 3.08 square miles (8.0 km^{2}). The stream is entirely within the United States Geological Survey quadrangle of Meshoppen. The mouth of the stream is at Forkston. The designated use of the stream is aquatic life.

The community of Forkston, which is located near Bowman Hollow, is one of only two areas of residential development in the watershed of Mehoopany Creek.

Bowman Hollow is not designated as an impaired waterbody. The stream is classified as a High-Quality Coldwater Fishery.

== History ==
Bowman Hollow is not an officially named stream, but instead takes the name of the valley through which it flows. The valley was entered into the Geographic Names Information System on August 2, 1979. Its identifier in the Geographic Names Information System is 1170066. The stream has also been historically known as Bowman Hollow Creek.

In 1922, G.L. Moore et al. received approval to construct a small dam across Bowman Hollow near the village of Forkston. In 1930, a 29.9-foot (9.1 m) steel bridge carrying a township road over the stream was built near Forkston. As of May 2015, it has an average daily traffic rate of 100 vehicles.

In 2012, Chief Gathering, LLC. applied for and/or received a permit to construct a natural gas pipeline that would impact several areas of Bowman Hollow and one or more of its unnamed tributaries with open cut trenching and timber mats, as well as a permanent access road.

== See also ==
- North Branch Mehoopany Creek, next tributary of Mehoopany Creek going downstream
- White Brook (Mehoopany Creek), next tributary of Mehoopany Creek going upstream
- List of rivers of Pennsylvania
