= Cherry Run (South Branch Bowman Creek tributary) =

Stream in Pennsylvania, United States

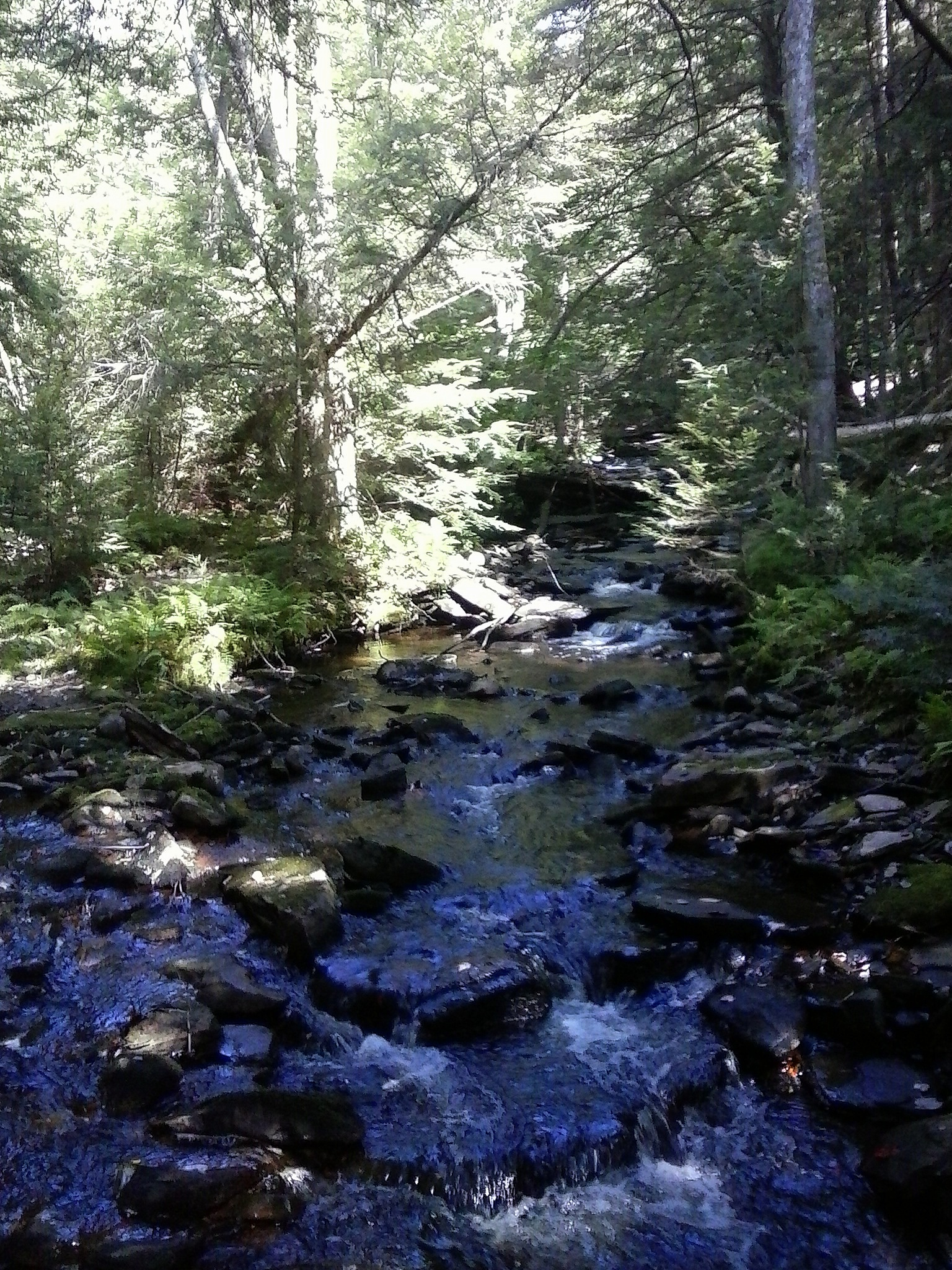
- Cherry Run from the Little Cherry Run Trail

Physical characteristics
- Source
  - location: Cherry Ridge in Fairmount Township, Luzerne County, Pennsylvania
  - elevation: between 2,280 and 2,300 feet (695 and 701 m)
- Mouth
  - location: South Branch Bowman Creek near Mountain Springs in Ross Township, Luzerne County, Pennsylvania
  - coordinates: 41°20′20″N 76°14′35″W
  - elevation: 1,900 ft (580 m)
- Length: 2.1 mi (3.4 km)
- Basin size: 1.65 mi^{2} (4.3 km^{2})

Basin features
- Progression: South Branch Bowman Creek → Bowman Creek → Susquehanna River → Chesapeake Bay
- Tributaries
  - right: two unnamed tributaries

Cherry Run is a tributary of South Branch Bowman Creek in Luzerne County, Pennsylvania, in the United States. It is approximately 2.1 miles (3.4 km) long and flows through Fairmount Township and Ross Township. The watershed of the stream has an area of 1.65 square miles (4.3 km^{2}). The surficial geology in its vicinity consists of alluvial fan, alluvium, bedrock, Wisconsinan Till, wetlands, and a peat bog. The stream has cascades and contains wild trout.

== Course ==
Cherry Run begins on Cherry Ridge in Fairmount Township. It flows southeast for several tenths of a mile and passes through a wetland before turning south-southeast and passing through another wetland. The stream then turns east-southeast, receiving an unnamed tributary from the right and passing through a third wetland with a pond. At this point, it turns south-southeast for several tenths of a mile and its valley becomes narrower and deeper. The stream receives another unnamed tributary from the right in this reach. At the end of the valley, the stream reaches its confluence with South Branch Bowman Creek.

Cherry Run joins South Branch Bowman Creek 1.25 miles (2.01 km) upstream of its mouth.

== Geography and geology ==
The elevation near the mouth of Cherry Run is 1,900 feet (580 m) above sea level. The elevation of the stream's source is between 2,280 and 2,300 feet (695 and 701 m) above sea level.

The surficial geology in the vicinity of the upper reaches of Cherry Run mainly consists of a till known as Wisconsinan Till. However, the stream also flows through patches of wetlands and a peat bog. The surficial geology along the lower reaches of the stream mainly features bedrock consisting of sandstone and shale. However, there is alluvial fan and alluvium near the mouth.

There are a number of cascades on Cherry Run. The stream also flows through a glen at one point.

== Watershed ==
The watershed of Cherry Run has an area of 1.65 square miles (4.3 km^{2}). The mouth of the stream is in the United States Geological Survey quadrangle of Sweet Valley. However, its source is in the quadrangle of Red Rock. The mouth of the stream is located near Mountain Springs.

The entire length of Cherry run is in Ricketts Glen State Park.

== History and recreation ==
Cherry Run was entered into the Geographic Names Information System on August 2, 1979. Its identifier in the Geographic Names Information System is 1171670.

Cherry Run has been described as "incredibly beautiful" and "phenomenal" in Jeff Mitchell's book Hiking the Endless Mountains: Exploring the Wilderness of Northeastern Pennsylvania. The stream is near a hiking trail in Ricketts Glen State Park: the Cherry Run Trail, which crosses Cherry Run.

== Biology ==
Wild trout naturally reproduce in Cherry Run from its headwaters downstream to its mouth. Dense forests of hemlocks occur in the vicinity of the stream.

== See also ==
- List of rivers of Pennsylvania
- List of tributaries of Bowman Creek
