= South Branch Bowman Creek =

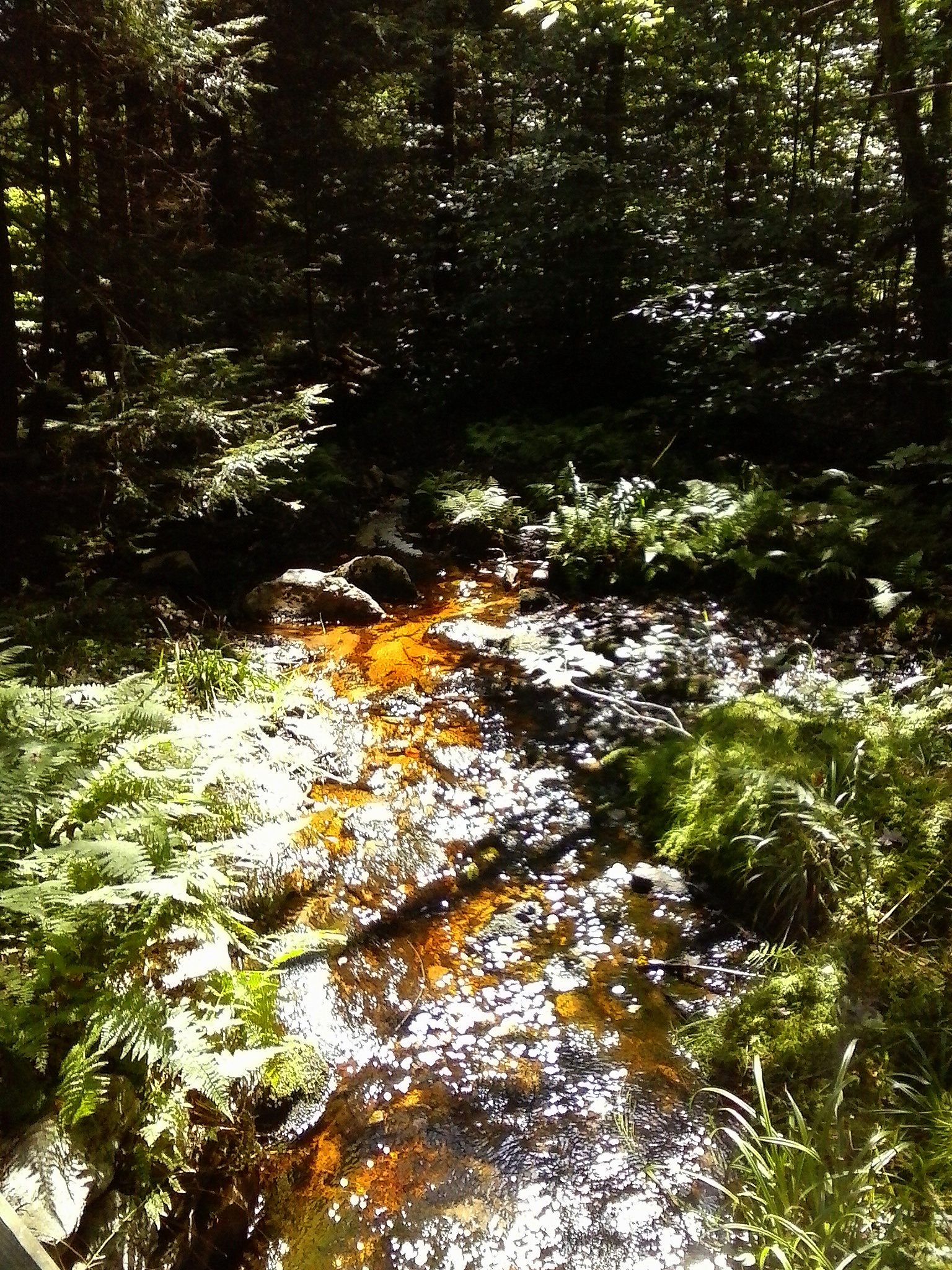
- South Branch Bowman Creek in Ricketts Glen State Park

Physical characteristics
- Source
  - location: wetland in Fairmount Township, Luzerne County, Pennsylvania
  - elevation: between 2,160 and 2,180 feet (658 and 664 m)
- Mouth
  - location: Bowman Creek at Mountain Springs in Ross Township, Luzerne County, Pennsylvania
  - coordinates: 41°20′26″N 76°13′14″W
  - elevation: 1,837 ft (560 m)
- Length: 3.0 mi (4.8 km)
- Basin size: 3.92 sq mi (10.2 km^{2})

Basin features
- Progression: Bowman Creek → Susquehanna River → Chesapeake Bay
- Tributaries
  - left: Cherry Run

South Branch Bowman Creek (also known as Cherry Run) is a tributary of Bowman Creek in Luzerne County, Pennsylvania, in the United States. It is approximately 3.0 miles (4.8 km) long and flows through Fairmount Township and Ross Township. The watershed of the creek has an area of 3.92 square miles (10.2 km^{2}). The surficial geology in its vicinity consists of alluvial fan, alluvium, Wisconsinan Ice-Contact Sratified Drift, fill, lakes, Boulder Colluvium, Wisconsinan Till, Wisconsinan Bouldery Till, wetlands, and bedrock. Most of the creek is in Ricketts Glen State Park. It has one named tributary, which is known as Cherry Run. The creek's watershed is designated as a High-Quality Coldwater Fishery and a Migratory Fishery.

== Course ==
South Branch Bowman Creek begins in a wetland in Fairmount Township. It flows north for several hundred feet before flowing in an easterly direction for several tenths of a mile. The creek then turns north for several tenths of a mile before heading east-northeast. In this reach, it receives Cherry Run, its only named tributary, from the left. It then turns east-southeast before turning east-northeast again and passing through Mount Spring Lake. From the eastern end of the lake, the creek flows east-northeast for a few tenths of a mile before reaching its confluence with Bowman Creek.

South Branch Bowman Creek joins Bowman Creek 26.13 miles (42.05 km) upstream of its mouth.

=== Tributaries ===
South Branch Bowman Creek has one named tributary, which is known as Cherry Run. Cherry Run joins South Branch Bowman Creek 1.25 miles (2.01 km) upstream of its mouth, near Mountain Springs, and drains an area of 1.65 square miles (4.3 km^{2}).

== Geography and geology ==
The elevation near the mouth of South Branch Bowman Creek is 1,837 feet (560 m) above sea level. The elevation of the creek's source is between 2,160 and 2,180 feet (658 and 664 m) above sea level.

The surficial geology in the lower reaches of the valley of South Branch Bowman Creek mainly consists of alluvium, alluvial fan, Wisconsinan Ice-Stratified Drift, and a lake. However, there is also fill and Boulder Colluvium, which is rich in boulders containing quartz, sandstone, or conglomerate. The creek's valley is the only place in the Sweet Valley quadrangle with the exception of the valley of North Branch Bowman Creek. Further upstream in the valley, there is Wiscoinsnan Bouldery Till, more Boulder Colluvium, and a patch of Wisconsinan Till. The valley walls have surficial geology consisting of bedrock made of sandstone and shale. In the creek's upper reaches, the surficial geology along it mainly consists of Wisconsinan Bouldery Till, Wisconsinan Till, and wetlands.

In preglacial times, the area that is now Lake Leigh and part of Lake Jean drained into South Branch Bowman Creek. However, glacial action caused them to become part of the watershed of Kitchen Creek. There used to be a glacial lake in the valley of South Branch Bowman Creek.

== Hydrology and watershed ==
The watershed of South Branch Bowman Creek has an area of 3.92 square miles (10.2 km^{2}). The mouth of the creek is in the United States Geological Survey quadrangle of Sweet Valley. However, its source is in the quadrangle of Red Rock. The mouth of the creek is located at Mountain Springs.

Most of the length of South Branch Bowman Creek is in Ricketts Glen State Park, but its lower reaches (including Mount Springs Lake) are on land owned by the Pennsylvania Fish and Boat Commission. Hunting is permitted along all of the creek that is in Ricketts Glen State Park, except for the headwaters area.

In the 1980s, South Branch Bowman Creek was found to have high levels of acidity.

== History and recreation ==
South Branch Bowman Creek was entered into the Geographic Names Information System on August 2, 1979. Its identifier in the Geographic Names Information System is 1188015. South Branch Bowman Creek is also known as Cherry Run. This variant name appears in a 1953 map by the United States Geological Survey. However, it was realized in 1969 that this variant name was erroneous.

A hiking trail known as the Cherry Run Trail crosses South Branch Bowman Creek in Ricketts Glen State Park. Another hiking trail, the Mountain Springs Trail, is also in the creek's vicinity.

== Biology ==
The drainage basin of South Branch Bowman Creek is designated as a High-Quality Coldwater Fishery and a Migratory Fishery. Wild trout naturally reproduce in the creek from its headwaters downstream to its mouth.

== See also ==
- Bean Run, next tributary of Bowman Creek going downstream
- North Branch Bowman Creek
- List of rivers of Pennsylvania
- List of tributaries of Bowman Creek
