= Frederick Palen =

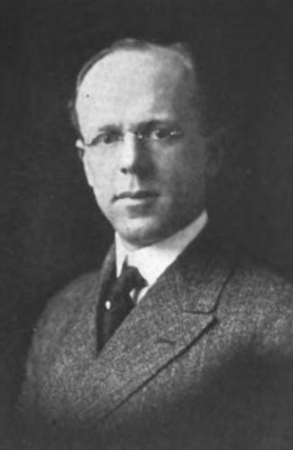
- Born: Frederick Pomeroy Palen; April 20, 1872; Jenningsville, Pennsylvania
- Died: December 2, 1933 (aged 61); New York, New York
- Education: Cornell University
- Occupation(s): Businessman, engineer
- Spouse: Lina Mayo (m. 1906)
- Children: 1

Frederick Pomeroy Palen (April 20, 1872 – December 2, 1933) was a prominent shipping executive.

== Biography ==
Frederick Palen was born in Jenningsville, Pennsylvania on April 20, 1872, and educated at Monticello, New York. He went to Cornell University, where he earned a degree in mechanical engineering.

Palen took a job as a draughtsman for the Newport News Shipbuilding and Dry Dock Company, became chief engineer of the Company in 1906, and general manager in 1912; in 1915, he was made a vice president. After acknowledging before a Senate panel in 1929 that he was responsible for employing William B. Shearer as an observer at the 1927 Geneva arms control conference, however, Palen resigned his position.

In March 1930, Palen became president of the Primrose Publishing Corporation, which published The Marine Journal. He was also involved with the creation of the Merchant Marine Act of 1928.

== Personal life ==
Palen married Lina Mayo in 1906, and had one son, Frederick. Palen died of pneumonia on December 2, 1933, at the Rockefeller Research Institute in New York.
