= Lovelton, Pennsylvania =

Coordinates: 41°32′21″N 76°11′18″W

Lovelton is an unincorporated populated place in North Branch Township, Pennsylvania, United States. It is in the United States Geological Survey quadrangle of Jenningsville.

== History ==
A blacksmith named Azariah Winslow, who was one of the first settlers in North Branch Township, along with Vose and Lovelton, settled in the area of Lovelton circa 1800. The community was named for the early settler of the same name.

A hotel was opened in Lovelton in 1868 by S. Bigley, and the first school and post office in the township was also built in the village. By 1880, the community contained a post office, a store, a blacksmith shop, a shoe shop, a gristmill, and approximately twenty homes. At this point, it was the only village in the township. The Lovelton Grange Hall was built in 1904 and was still standing a century later, mostly unchanged.

The North Branch Trout Derby Association has held a children's fishing derby in the hatchery grounds at Lovelton.

== Geography ==
Lovelton is located at an elevation of 988 feet (301 m) above sea level. The community is situated deep in the valley of North Branch Mehoopany Creek at the confluence of Miller Brook. Several hills and mountains surround it, including Round Top, Oak Ridge, and Bartlett Mountain. The community is situated at the intersection of Pennsylvania Route 87 and Pennsylvania Route 187, but a few other roads pass through the vicinity.

== See also ==
- List of places in Pennsylvania
