= Jenningsville, Pennsylvania =

Unincorporated community in Pennsylvania, U.S.

Coordinates: 41°34′59″N 76°08′38″W

Jenningsville is an unincorporated community in Wyoming County, in the U.S. state of Pennsylvania.

== History ==
A post office called Jenningsville was established in 1856, and remained in operation until 1911. The community has the name of J. T. and William N. Jennings, proprietors of a local mill.

== Notable person ==
Frederick Palen, a businessperson in the shipping industry, was born at Jenningsville in 1872.
