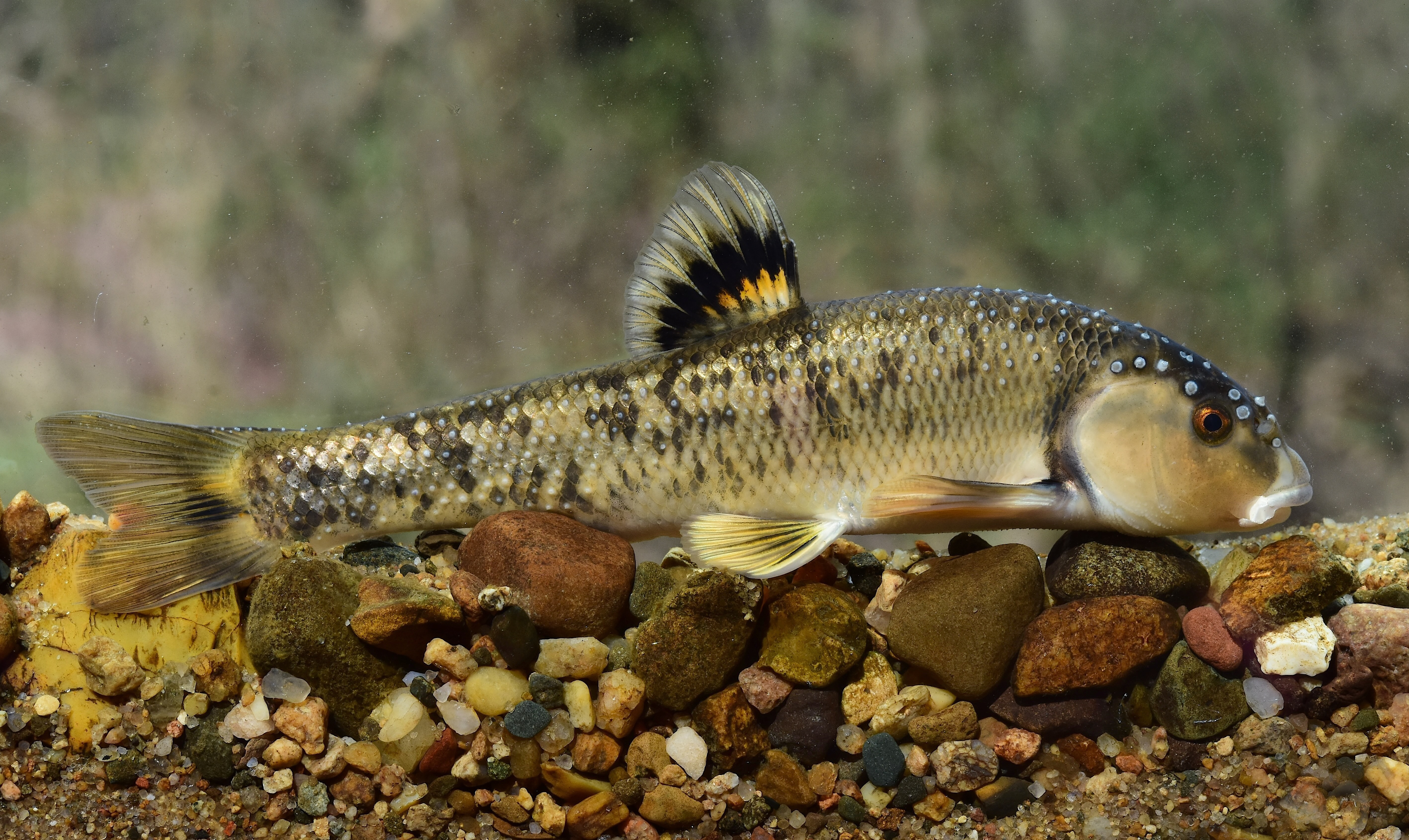
- Campostoma anomalum

Conservation status
- Least Concern (IUCN 3.1)

- Secure (NatureServe)

Scientific classification
- Kingdom: Animalia
- Phylum: Chordata
- Class: Actinopterygii
- Order: Cypriniformes
- Family: Leuciscidae
- Subfamily: Pogonichthyinae
- Genus: Campostoma
- Species: C. anomalum

Binomial name
- Campostoma anomalum Rafinesque, 1820

Synonyms
- List: Rutilus anomalous Rafinesque, 1820; Catostomus melanotus Rafinesque, 1820; Exoglossum spinicephalum Valenciennes, 1844; Exoglossum dubium Kirtland, 1845; Campostoma formosulum Girard, 1856; Dionda plumbea Girard, 1856; Campostoma callipteryx Cope, 1865; Campostoma gobioninum Cope, 1865; Campostoma hippops Cope, 1865; Campostoma mormyrus Cope, 1865; Campostoma aikenii Cope, 1875; Campostoma brevis Haseman, 1906; Campostoma anomalum michauxi Fowler, 1945

= Central stoneroller =

Species of fish

The central stoneroller, or Ohio stoneroller (Campostoma anomalum), is a species of freshwater ray-finned fish in the family Leuciscidae, the shiners, daces and minnows. This fish is found in North America.

== Biology ==
Stonerollers have a rounded snout overhanging a crescent-shaped mouth, a hard ridge of cartilage on the lower lip, and irregular patches of dark colored scales on the sides of the body. Breeding males have orange colored fins with a black band on the dorsal fin and often on the anal fin; breeding tubercles (keratinized growths) also cover the head, back, and sides of the body.

== Distribution ==
The central stoneroller is widespread in freshwater streams throughout a large portion of the eastern, central, and midwestern United States. It is present in the Atlantic Ocean, Great Lakes, Mississippi River, and Hudson Bay basins in the US, from New York west to North Dakota and Wyoming and south to South Carolina and Texas. Isolated populations are also found in Canada and Mexico. The central stoneroller is benthopelagic, inhabiting either the midwaters or bottom of freshwater streams and rivers. It requires some current and is most commonly found in riffles and pools of moderate to high gradient streams with a gravel substrate bottom. However, it is a very tolerant species and can be found in almost any stream system with adequate food, leading to its widespread distribution.

== Ecology ==
The central stoneroller is generally herbivorous, feeding primarily on algae scraped from rocks and logs with the cartilaginous ridge on its lower jaw. Young fish feed on rotifers, filamentous algae, and microcrustaceans. It also feeds on detritus, diatoms, and occasionally aquatic insects. It is classified as a grazing minnow in its feeding behavior, and large schools of these fish often feed together. Central stonerollers may consume up to 27 percent of their body weight in benthic algae per day. One Kansas study found that algae contributed most (47 percent) to the diet of central stonerollers, followed by detritus (30 percent), animal matter (21 percent), and terrestrial vegetation (2 percent). Some human-induced factors that reduce the abundance of the central stoneroller are altered flow regimens, habitat fragmentation, impacts to aquatic and riparian habitat associated with agricultural practices, and increased siltation and aquatic vegetation.

== Life history ==
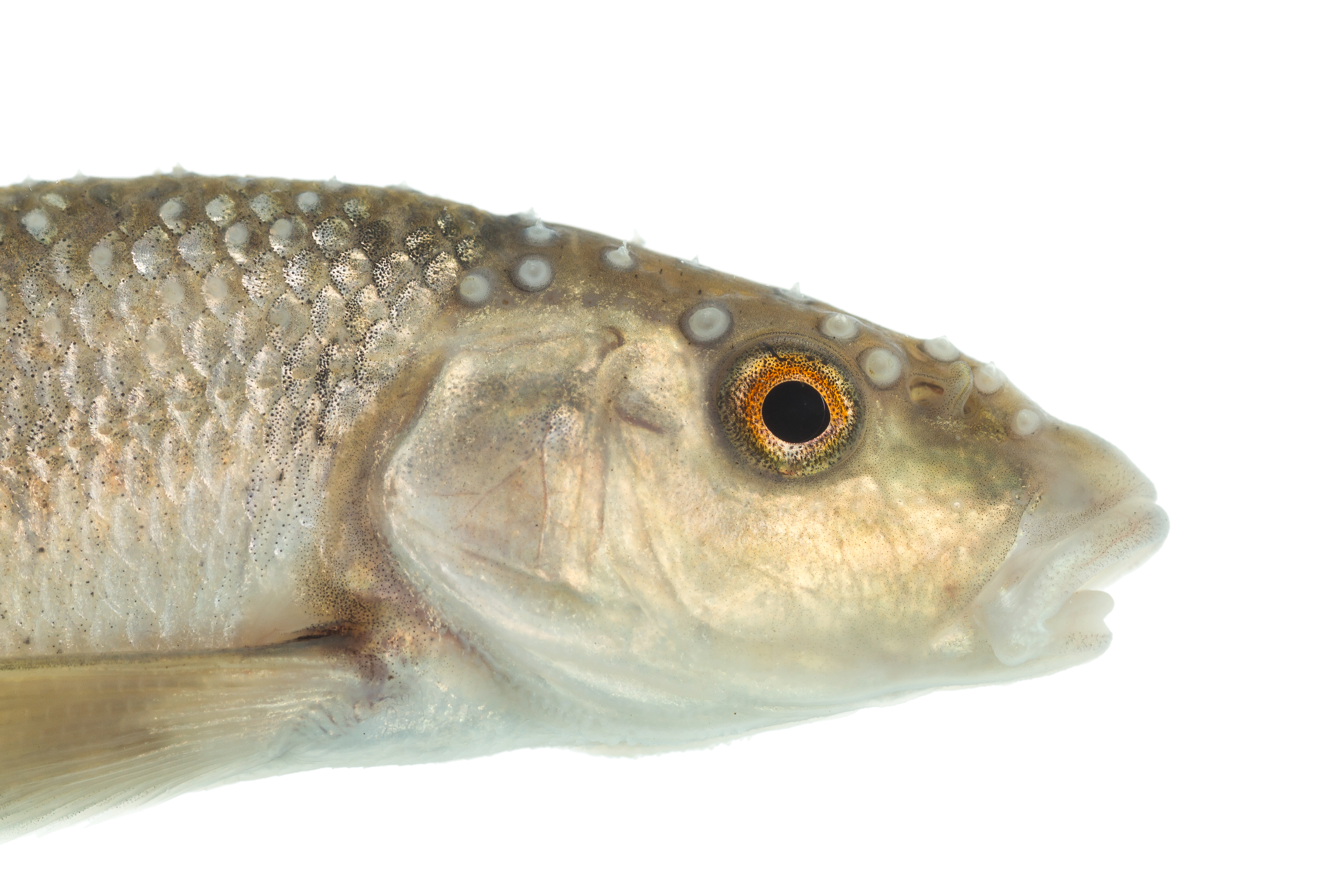
Showing nuptial tubercles

Central stonerollers reach maturity in one to four years. Breeding males begin building nests in late winter and continue throughout midsummer, creating large, bowl-shaped depressions in calmer waters by rolling stones along the bottom with their noses, giving them their common name. The males aggressively defend their nests against rival males. Spawning occurs in early spring and summer, varying by region, with those fish in warmer climates generally spawning earlier than those in colder climates. Females remain in deeper water outside the nesting site, entering only briefly to produce anywhere between 200 and 4800 eggs in a nest. The male fertilizes the eggs, causing them to become adhesive and lodge in the gravel of the nest, preventing them from being carried away by the currents. The eggs are then abandoned by both parents and hatch within a few days. The newly hatched fish school together to feed in the warmer and more protected backwaters and vegetated stream margins. This species is generally found in small, clear streams with gravel, rubble, or exposed bedrock. Often the most abundant species in small streams, schools may contain several hundred individuals. Central stonerollers also display some intolerance to heavy siltation or pollutants, which affect the quantity of available algae in pool and riffle habitats.

== Management ==
The central stoneroller is widely distributed, so is not being threatened to a large extent, nor is it listed on any federal or state conservation lists. The central stoneroller is listed as "least concern" on the IUCN Red list since 2013.
