= Blacknose dace =

The blacknose dace is either of two ray-finned fish species:

- Eastern blacknose dace, Rhinichthys atratulus
- Western blacknose dace, Rhinichthys obtusus
