= Colley Township, Sullivan County, Pennsylvania =

Township in Pennsylvania, US

Coordinates: 41°31′30″N 76°14′44″W

Colley Township, Pennsylvania
- Township
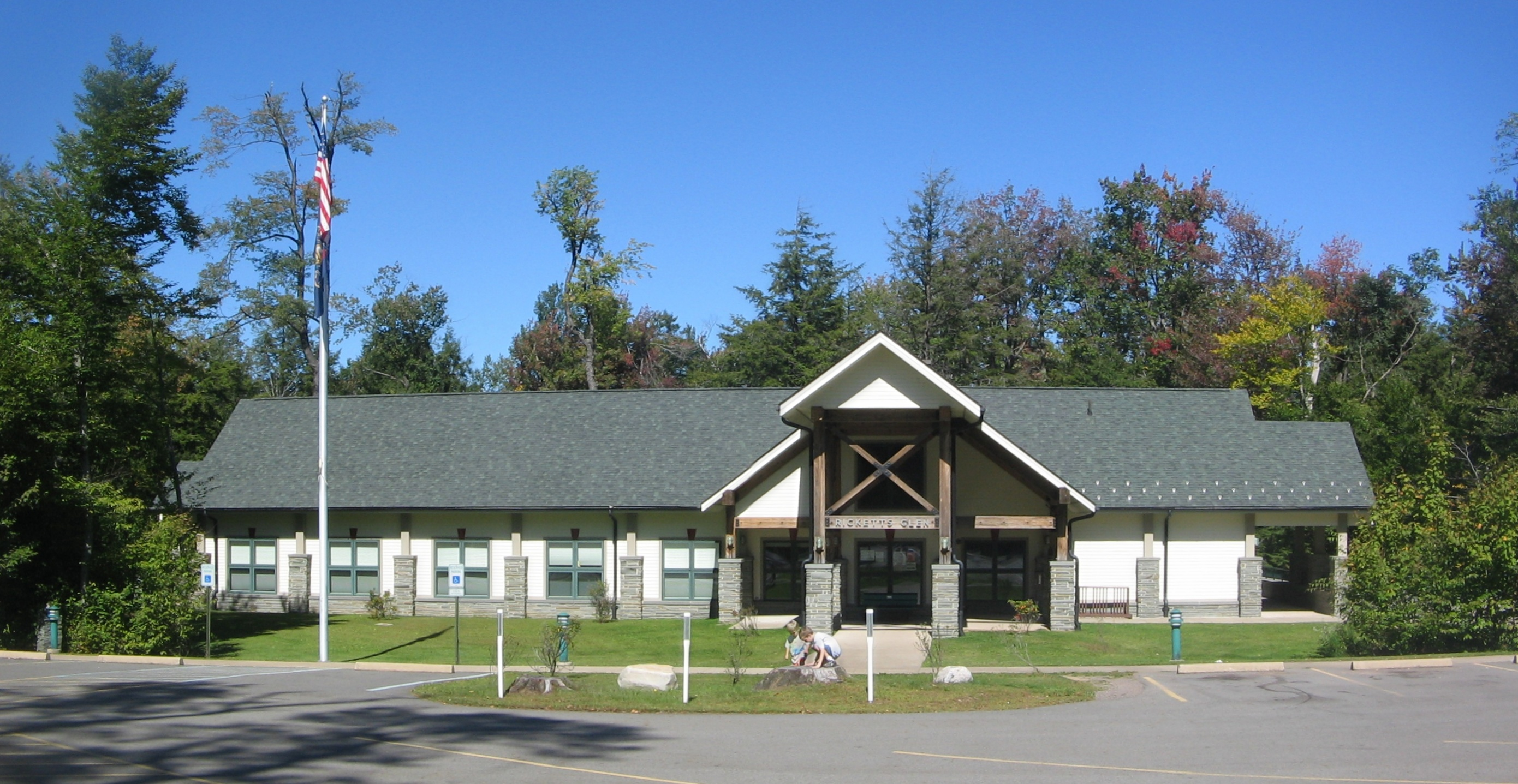
- The park office for Ricketts Glen State Park is in Colley Township

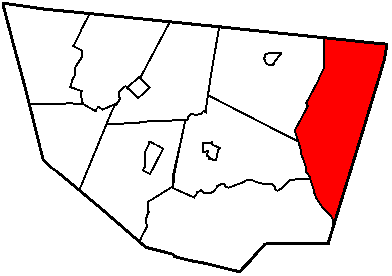
- Map of Sullivan County, Pennsylvania highlighting Colley Township

- Map of Pennsylvania highlighting Sullivan County
- Country: United States
- State: Pennsylvania
- County: Sullivan
- Settled: 1823
- Incorporated: 1848

Area
  - Total: 59.22 sq mi (153.37 km^{2})
  - Land: 58.26 sq mi (150.88 km^{2})
  - Water: 0.96 sq mi (2.48 km^{2})

Population (2020)
  - Total: 626 ▼
  - Estimate (2021): 627
  - Density: 11.7/sq mi (4.51/km^{2})
- Time zone: UTC-5 (Eastern (EST))
  - Summer (DST): UTC-4 (EDT)
- Area code: 570
- FIPS code: 42-113-15208

Colley Township is a township in Sullivan County, Pennsylvania, United States. The population was 626 at the 2020 census. The village of Lopez is located in the township.

== History ==
The Clemuel Ricketts Mansion was added to the National Register of Historic Places in 1983.

== Geography ==
According to the United States Census Bureau, the township has a total area of 59.2 square miles (153 km^{2}), of which 58.25 square miles (150.9 km^{2}) is land and 0.95 square miles (2.5 km^{2}) (1.63%) is water.

Colley Township is bordered by Bradford County to the north, Wyoming and Luzerne Counties to the east, Davidson Township to the southwest, and Laporte and Cherry Townships to the west.

Colley Township is home to the Clemuel Ricketts Mansion on Ganoga Lake, listed on the National Register of Historic Places, and part of Ricketts Glen State Park.

== Demographics ==
Historical population
Census	Pop.	Note	%±
2010	694		—
2020	626		−9.8%
2021 (est.)	627		0.2%
U.S. Decennial Census

=== 2010 ===
At the 2010 census there were 694 people, 214 households, and 116 families living in the township. The population density was 11.9 people per square mile (4.65/km^{2}). There were 640 housing units at an average density of 11/sq mi (4.3/km^{2}). The racial makeup of the township was 76.7% White, 21.6% African American, 0.4% Native American, 1.2% Asian, and 0.1% from two or more races. Hispanic or Latino of any race were 5.8%.

Of the 214 households 12.6% had children under the age of 18 living with them, 45.3% were married couples living together, 5.6% had a female householder with no husband present, and 45.8% were non-families. 40.2% of households were one person and 22.4% were one person aged 65 or older. The average household size was 1.94 and the average family size was 2.57.

The age distribution was 16.9% under the age of 18, 65.7% from 18 to 64, and 17.4% 65 or older. The median age was 25.3 years.

The median household income was $30,096 and the median family income was $35,208. Males had a median income of $23,750 versus $40,250 for females. The per capita income for the township was $14,243. About 19.5% of families and 31.5% of the population were below the poverty line, including 20.2% of those under age 18 and 30.1% of those age 65 or over.

Pajamas made in the Lopez Factories were used in the Hollywood Film, Pajama Party.

=== 2000 ===
At the 2000 census there were 647 people, 179 households, and 95 families living in the township. The population density was 11.2 people per square mile (4.3/km^{2}). There were 542 housing units at an average density of 9.3/sq mi (3.6/km^{2}). The racial makeup of the township was 70.48% White, 20.87% African American, 0.93% Native American, 0.15% Asian, 4.17% from other races, and 3.40% from two or more races. Hispanic or Latino of any race were 7.57%.

Of the 179 households 14.0% had children under the age of 18 living with them, 44.1% were married couples living together, 5.0% had a female householder with no husband present, and 46.4% were non-families. 38.5% of households were one person and 23.5% were one person aged 65 or older. The average household size was 2.03 and the average family size was 2.69.

The age distribution was 28.9% under the age of 18, 26.3% from 18 to 24, 11.6% from 25 to 44, 13.8% from 45 to 64, and 19.5% 65 or older. The median age was 22 years. For every 100 females, there were 158.8 males. For every 100 females age 18 and over, there were 144.7 males.

The median household income was $23,542 and the median family income was $33,333. Males had a median income of $28,036 versus $20,417 for females. The per capita income for the township was $10,979. About 3.0% of families and 45.6% of the population were below the poverty line, including none of those under age 18 and 17.9% of those age 65 or over.
