= North Branch Township, Pennsylvania =

Township in Pennsylvania, US

North Branch Township
- Township
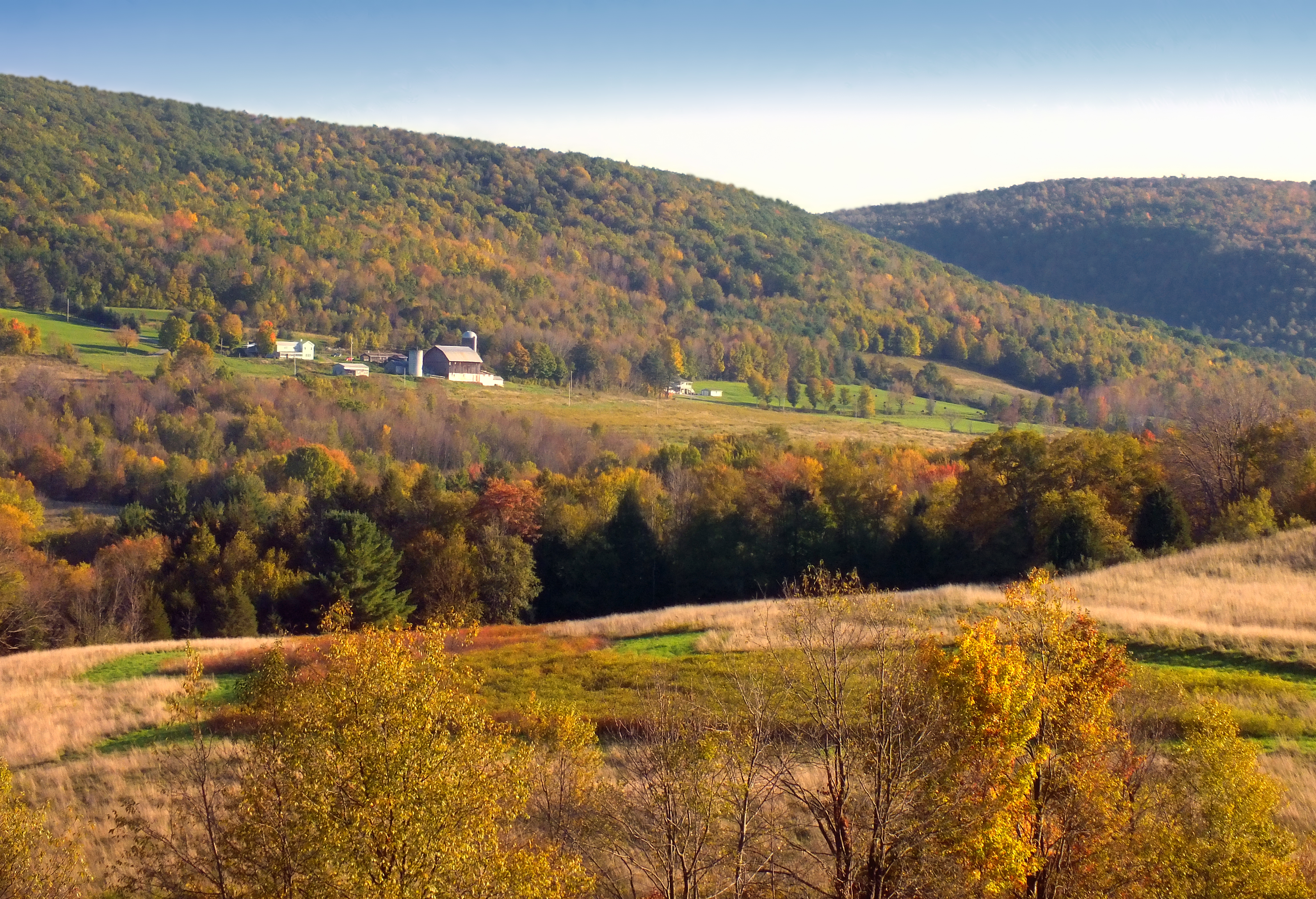
- A farm in the township

- Location of North Branch Township in Pennsylvania
- Coordinates: 41°29′00″N 76°11′59″W
- Country: United States
- State: Pennsylvania
- County: Wyoming

Area
  - Total: 22.51 sq mi (58.29 km^{2})
  - Land: 22.37 sq mi (57.93 km^{2})
  - Water: 0.14 sq mi (0.36 km^{2})
- Elevation: 2,175 ft (663 m)

Population (2020)
  - Total: 236 ▲
  - Estimate (2021): 235
  - Density: 9.3/sq mi (3.61/km^{2})
- Time zone: UTC-5 (EST)
  - Summer (DST): UTC-4 (EDT)
- ZIP Code: 18629
- Area code: 570
- FIPS code: 42-131-54824

North Branch Township is a township in Wyoming County, Pennsylvania. The population was 236 at the 2020 census.

== Geography ==
According to the U.S. Census Bureau, the township has a total area of 22.5 square miles (58.2 km^{2}): 22.3 square miles (57.9 km^{2}) is land; 0.1 square miles (0.3 km^{2}, or 0.53%) is water.

== Demographics ==
Historical population
| Census | Pop. | Note | %± |
|---|---|---|---|
| 2010 | 206 | | — |
| 2020 | 236 | | 14.6% |
| 2021 (est.) | 235 | | −0.4% |
U.S. Decennial Census

As of the census of 2010, there were 206 people, 93 households, and 56 families residing in the township. The population density was 9.2 people per square mile (3.6/km^{2}). There were 129 housing units at an average density of 5.8/sq mi (2.3/km^{2}). The racial makeup of the township was 96.6% White, 0.5% Native American, 1% Asian and 1.9% from two or more races. Hispanic or Latino of any race were 3.9% of the population.

There were 93 households, out of which 19.4% had children under the age of 18 living with them, 54.8% were married couples living together, 3.2% had a female householder with no husband present, and 39.8% were non-families. 28% of all households were made up of individuals, and 11.9% had someone living alone who was 65 years of age or older. The average household size was 2.22 and the average family size was 2.80.

In the township, the population was spread out, with 17.5% under the age of 18, 65.5% from 18 to 64, and 17% who were 65 years of age or older. The median age was 49 years. The median income for a household in the township was $47,083, and the median income for a family was $46,250. Males had a median income of $55,000 versus $21,818 for females. The per capita income for the township was $24,713. About 3.6% of families and 11.3% of the population were below the poverty line, including 44.4% of those under the age of eighteen and 23.5% of those 65 or over.
