= Quadrangle (geography) =

Large area in geology or geography

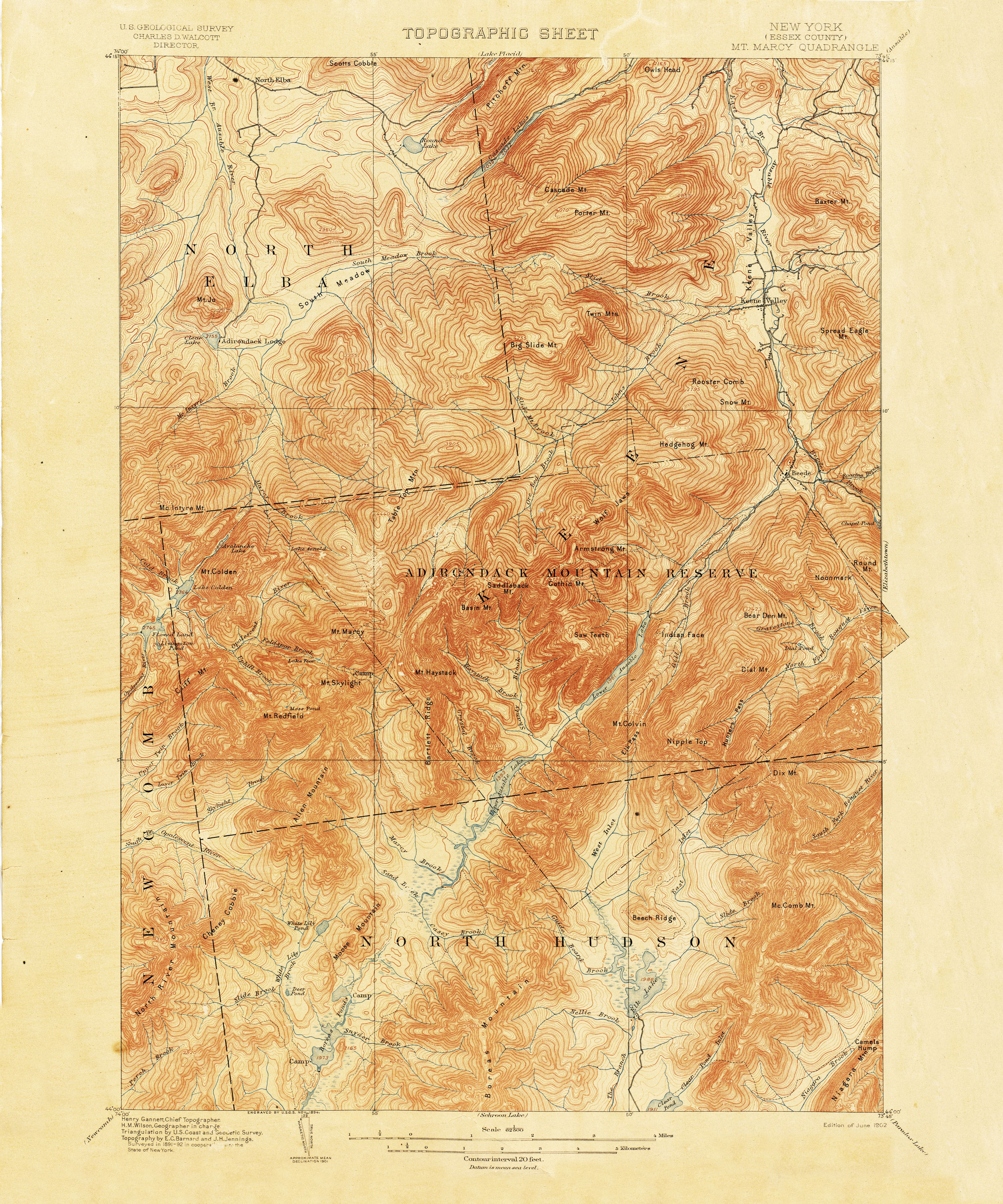
New York (Essex County) Mt. Marcy: an 1892 USGS quadrangle map (or topographic sheet) of the Mount Marcy area of the Adirondacks in New York State from the first decades of the United States Geological Survey.

A quadrangle (or quad) is a region of the Earth's surface bounded by two parallels (circles of constant latitude) and two meridians (lines of constant longitude). The term is especially associated with topographic maps produced by the United States Geological Survey (USGS) of quadrangles covering the United States. Quadrangle maps are usually named after local physiographic features; for example, "the Ranger Creek, Texas quad".

From approximately 1947–1992, the USGS produced the 7.5 minute series, with each map covering an area one-quarter of the older 15-minute quad series, which it replaced. A 7.5 minute quadrangle map covers an area of 49 to 70 square miles (130 to 180 km^{2}). Both map series were produced via photogrammetric analysis of aerial photography using stereoplotters supplemented by field surveys. These maps employ the 1927 North American Datum (NAD27); conversion or a change in settings is necessary when using a GPS which by default employs the WGS84 geodetic datum. Beginning in 2009, the USGS made available digital versions of 7.5 minute quadrangle maps based on GIS data that use the NAD83 datum, which is typically within one meter of WGS84, or within the uncertainty of most GPS coordinate measurements. The USGS also produces quarter quadrangle (QQ) maps of areas 3.75 minutes square.

The surfaces of other planets have also been divided into quadrangles by the USGS. Martian quadrangles are also named after local features.

== See also ==
- GEOREF quadrangle
- List of quadrangles on Mercury
- List of quadrangles on Venus
- List of quadrangles on the Moon
- List of quadrangles on Mars
- List of quadrangles on Io
- List of quadrangles on Ganymede
- List of quadrangles on Callisto
- Quadrilateral
