= Hicks Creek (Susquehanna River tributary) =

Hicks Creek Abraham Creek, Abrahams Creek, Carpenter River, Carpenters Creek, Hicks River, Hicks Run

Physical characteristics
- Source
  - location: valley on Peterson Mountain in Exeter Township, Luzerne County, Pennsylvania
  - elevation: between 1,420 and 1,440 feet (430 and 440 m)
- Mouth
  - location: Susquehanna River in Exeter, Luzerne County, Pennsylvania
  - coordinates: 41°20′30″N 75°48′14″W
  - elevation: 531 ft (162 m)
- Length: 4.5 mi (7.2 km)
- Basin size: 3.95 mi^{2} (10.2 km^{2})

Basin features
- Progression: Susquehanna River → Chesapeake Bay

Hicks Creek is a tributary of the Susquehanna River in Luzerne County, Pennsylvania, in the United States. It is approximately 4.5 miles (7.2 km) long and flows through Exeter Township and Exeter. The watershed of the creek has an area of 3.95 square miles (10.2 km^{2}). A reach of the creek is designated as an impaired stream, with the cause of the impairment being sedimentation/siltation and water/flow variability. It is not a perennial stream. The upper reaches of the creek's watershed is mountainous, but the creek has an extremely low gradient in its lower reaches. A reach of the creek has been channelized and a debris basin is located along it. There are several bridge crossings along its course.

Most of the watershed of Hicks Creek is forested land. However, residential areas, open space, meadows, and various other land uses also occur. The creek has been described as a "typical urban stream", but its upper reaches are considerably different from its lower reaches. Hicks Creek used to be a tributary of Abrahams Creek, but stream realignment due to mine subsidence caused it to relocated itself and become a tributary of the Susquehanna River since the 1940s. The creek is designated as a Coldwater Fishery and a Migratory Fishery, but has low levels of aquatic biodiversity.

== Course ==
Hicks Creek begins in a valley on Peterson Mountain in Exeter Township. It flows southwest for several tenths of a mile before turning south and entering Exeter. In Exeter, the creek flows through a water gap for several tenths of a mile and continues to flow south from the southern side of the gap. Over the next several tenths of a mile, it gradually turns east and then north before turning northeast for several tenths of a mile. The creek then turns north for a short distance before turning east-northeast. Several tenths of a mile further downstream, it crosses Pennsylvania Route 92 and reaches its confluence with the Susquehanna River near Scovell Island.

Hicks Creek joins the Susquehanna River 198.46 miles (319.39 km) upriver of its mouth.

=== Tributaries ===
Hicks Creek has no named tributaries. However, it does have several unnamed tributaries. Most of these join the creek in its upper reaches.

== Hydrology ==
Part of Hicks Creek is not designated as an impaired stream. However, a reach of the creek is designated as impaired. The cause of the impairment is sedimentation/siltation and water/flow variability. The likely source of the impairment is road runoff.

Hicks Creek experiences low flow in dry weather. However, it also is prone to flash flooding. The creek also experiences nonpoint source pollution, as well as siltation, sedimentation, and streambank erosion. In the 1980s, hazardous waste was observed in the creek.

Hicks Creek has perennial flow upstream of Slocum Avenue. Downstream of this point, the creek flows into a mine pool and loses its flow. However, it still flows during storm events and snowmelt.

In 2001, Hicks Creek was observed to have foul-smelling water and a slow flow in some reaches. In 2013, there were reports that an unknown person was contaminating Hicks Creek with oil.

== Geography and geology ==
The elevation near the mouth of Hicks Creek is 531 feet (162 m) above sea level. The elevation of the creek's source is between 1,420 and 1,440 feet (430 and 440 m) above sea level. The lower reaches of the creek have an extremely low gradient of only 12 feet (3.7 m) in 1.9 miles (3.1 km). However, in its upper reaches, it drops 800 feet (240 m) in 2.4 miles. This low gradient is linked to the surface mining activities that were done in the watershed in the 1940s and 1950s.

The northern part of the watershed of Hicks Creek is relatively mountainous. Most of the watershed's highest elevations occur in the northern two thirds of the creek's watershed. However, there are some hills along the southern edge of the watershed. Upstream of Slocum Avenue, he creek's valley has steep sides and a fairly steep floor.

Hicks Creek has mainly been channelized from Slocum Avenue downstream to its mouth. There is a debris basin on the creek just upstream of Slocum Avenue. It was built by the Pennsylvania Department of Environmental Protection in 2003 and serves to prevent debris from clogging the creek's lower reaches. The Pennsylvania Department of Environmental Protection also completed another flood protection project along the creek in 1982.

The hydrologic soil group C is predominant along most of Hicks Creek's upper reaches, though its headwaters are near the hydrologic soil group D. Hydrologic soil group A occurs in a large patch in the creek's middle reaches and hydrological soil group B occurs in two patches along the creek, one of which is near its mouth.

There is a railroad line near the lower reaches of Hicks Creek. Numerous road crossings and sediment basins occur in the watershed. A total of eight structures span the creek in its lower reaches. The furthest upstream is the Slocum Avenue bridge. Further downstream, it passes under three golf cart bridges at the Four Seasons Golf Course. Additionally, it crosses under Sturmer Avenue, Schooley Avenue, Packer Avenue, and Exeter Avenue. The creek flows through an artificial concrete channel in at least one reach. It flows through a pumping station near its mouth.

The zero damage elevation, at which flooding from Hicks Creek cannot cause any damage, ranges from 553.79 to 555.90 feet (168.80 to 169.44 m), depending on the stream reach.

== Watershed ==
The watershed of Hicks Creek has an area of 3.95 square miles (10.2 km^{2}). The creek is entirely within the United States Geological Survey quadrangle of Pittston. The watershed is mainly in Exeter, Exeter Township, and West Wyoming. However, a small area is in West Pittston. There are approximately 6.5 miles (10.5 km) of streams in the watershed.

The largest land use in the watershed of Hicks Creek is forested land, which makes up 57.0 percent of the total land area. Most of it is in the northern part of the watershed. The second-largest land use is residential land, which makes up 19.6 percent of the total land area. 6.7 percent each is devoted to open space and meadows, while 5.5 percent is commercial land. A total of 2.2 percent is abandoned mining land, 1.8 percent is agricultural land, and 0.5 percent is water. Several residential areas, such as Ida Acres, Schooley Village, and Wildflower Village, have been developed since the early 2000s in the watershed.

Hicks Creek flows through several sub-basins, including 1B, 1C, 2, 3, 4A, 6A, and 8A. The first three of these contain no impervious surfaces. However, sub-basin 3 contains 22.2 percent impervious surface and 20.0 percent of sub-basin 4A is impervious. A total of 30.0 and 42.7 percent of sub-basins 6A and 8A consist of impervious surfaces, respectively.

The watershed of Hicks Creek is prone to flooding from stormwater. In its lower reaches, this flooding is caused by a levee on the Susquehanna River.

The upper portion of the watershed of Hicks Creek is substantially different from the lower portion. The upper reaches, upstream of Slocum Avenue in Exeter, is largely undeveloped and undisturbed. However, there are some residential dwellings scattered throughout this reach. On the other hand, the lower reaches of the creek's watershed are predominantly flat and developed.

The Hicks Creek Watershed Association has described Hicks Creek as having the characteristics of a "typical urban stream".

== History ==
Hicks Creek was entered into the Geographic Names Information System on August 2, 1979. Its identifier in the Geographic Names Information System is 1200087. The creek has also been known as Abraham Creek, Abrahams Creek, Carpenter River, Carpenters Creek, Hicks River, and Hicks Run.

In addition to development, stream realignment has impacted Hicks Creek since the 1940s. The peak realignment occurred during the 1940s and 1950s.

Some maps of Hicks Creek have shown the creek as joining up with Abrahams Creek. However, others show it as turning eastward through a marshy area towards the Susquehanna River. The creek was formerly a tributary of Abrahams Creek, but mine subsidence caused it to change to its current course to the Susquehanna River. Flood control additionally contributed to the creek's realignment.

The Hicks Creek Watershed Association formed in 2001 to restore Hicks Creek and reestablish perennial flow. The organization was one of the winners of the Environmental Partnership Award in 2004.

Hicks Creek experienced flooding in June 2006. In some reaches, flooding was evident several hundred feet from the creek.

== Biology ==
The drainage basin of Hicks Creek is designated as a Coldwater Fishery and a Migratory Fishery.

Hicks Creek has a low level of aquatic biodiversity. It also has large amounts of "undesirable" streambank vegetation. Mosquitos have been known to breed along a stretch of the creek near Donna's Way in Exeter due to the slow speed of the creek's water.

== See also ==
- Lackawanna River, next tributary of the Susquehanna River going downriver
- Obendoffers Creek, next tributary of the Susquehanna River going upriver
- List of rivers of Pennsylvania
