= Abrahams Creek =

Creek in Pennsylvania

Abrahams Creek Abraham Creek, Abraham's Creek, Abram Creek, Abrams Creek
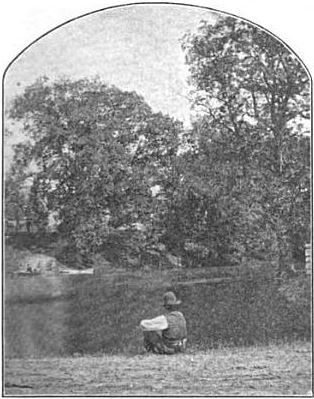
- Abrahams Creek in 1878

- Location within the United States Location within Pennsylvania

Physical characteristics
- Source
  - location: Franklin Township, Luzerne County, Pennsylvania
  - elevation: between 1,140 and 1,160 feet (350 and 350 m)
- Mouth
  - location: Susquehanna River in Forty Fort, Luzerne County, Pennsylvania
  - coordinates: 41°17′07″N 75°52′10″W
  - elevation: 522 ft (159 m)
- Length: 10.7 mi (17.2 km)
- Basin size: 17.4 sq mi (45 km^{2})

Basin features
- Progression: Susquehanna River → Chesapeake Bay
- Tributaries
  - left: two unnamed tributaries
  - right: four unnamed tributaries

Abrahams Creek (also known as Abraham Creek, Abraham's Creek, Abram Creek, or Abrams Creek) is a tributary of the Susquehanna River in Luzerne County, Pennsylvania, in the United States. It is approximately 10.7 miles (17.2 km) long and flows through Franklin Township, Dallas Township, Kingston Township, West Wyoming, Wyoming, and Forty Fort. The watershed of the creek has an area of 17.4 square miles (45 km^{2}) and occupies portions of nine municipalities in northeastern Luzerne County. The watershed is divided into the upper Abraham Creek watershed and the lower Abraham Creek watershed, which are joined by a canyon known as The Hollow. The upper part of the watershed is mostly rural, but the lower part is heavily urbanized. The creek's channel has been heavily modified in many places. Its drainage basin is designated as a Coldwater Fishery and a Migratory Fishery.

Abrahams Creek is a perennial stream with relatively poor water quality. However, it is not considered to be impaired. Its pH ranges from slightly acidic to slightly alkaline and has a daily sediment load of nearly 14 million pounds (31 million kilograms) per day. The main rock formations in the watershed include the Catskill Formation, the Llewellyn Formation, the Pottsville Group, the Mauch Chunk Formation, and the Pocono Formation. The main soils include the Chenango-Pope-Holly soil, the Lackawanna-Arnot-Morris soil, the Udorthents-Urban Land-Volusia soil, and the Volusia-Mardin-Lordstown soil.

Abrahams Creek is named after a historic Mohawk chief known as Tigoransera or "Little Abraham". The creek's watershed was historically heavily logged and farmed, and a sediment retention structure was built in the watershed in the 1970s. Numerous bridges have been built over the creek since 1925. The Abrahams Creek Watershed Association operates in the watershed. A 500-million-gallon reservoir known as Frances Slocum Lake was built on the creek in 1965.

== Course ==
Abrahams Creek begins in Franklin Township. It flows south-southwest for a short distance before turning south for several tenths of a mile, passing through the border between Dallas Township, Franklin Township, and Kingston Township, and entering Kingston Township. The creek then continues south for more than a mile before turning southeast and eventually entering Frances Slocum Lake. On the southeastern end of the lake, the creek turns east-northeast for more than a mile, entering a deep valley. It then turns south-southeast for a few miles, entering West Wyoming flowing through a water gap. The creek then turns southeast for some distance before turning southwest and entering Wyoming. It then turns west-southwest for a few miles before turning south and then west. The creek then turns south again, crossing US Route 11. It then turns southwest for more than a mile, entering Forty Fort and reaching its confluence with the Susquehanna River.

Abrahams Creek joins the Susquehanna River 192.14 miles (309.22 km) upstream of its mouth.

=== Tributaries ===
Hicks Creek was historically a tributary of Abrahams Creek. However, it was diverted to the northeast by strip mining in the 1940s and 1950s. It currently flows into the Susquehanna River. At present, Abrahams Creek has no officially named tributaries. However, it has six unnamed tributaries, two of which enter it from the left and four of which enter it from the right.

== Hydrology and climate ==
Abrahams Creek likely has relatively poor water quality, especially in its lower reaches. However, it is not considered by the Pennsylvania Department of Environmental Protection to be impaired. The creek is a perennial stream. It has experienced erosion in some places. The creek's discharge was in its upper reaches was measured to be 2.2 cubic feet per second (0.062 m^{3}/s) on May 12, 1970, and 0.1 to 0.2 cubic feet per second (0.0028 to 0.0057 m^{3}/s) on September 17, 1970. Further downstream, at West Wyoming, the discharge was measured twice in the 1960s. The values were 3.26 to 15.8 cubic feet per second (0.092 to 0.447 m^{3}/s).

The daily load of sediment in Abrahams Creek is 13,733,711 pounds (6,229,507 kg), which equates to a unit area loading of 1,267.75 pounds (575.04 kg) per acre per day. A total of 5,597,060 pounds (2,538,780 kg) comes from "transitional" land, 5,256,620 pounds (2,384,360 kg) comes from cropland, and 1,741,891 pounds (790,108 kg) comes from stream banks. A total of 599,240 pounds (271,810 kg) comes from hay and pastures and 330,880 pounds (150,080 kg) come from forested land. Low-intensity development contributes 93,440 pounds (42,380 kg) of sediment per day, unpaved roads contribute 63,620 pounds (28,860 kg), and coal mines contribute 18,420 pounds (8,360 kg). 3,980 pounds (1,810 kg) comes from high-intensity development, 360 pounds (160 kg) comes from wetlands, and 20 pounds (9.1 kg) comes from turf grass.

In the early 1970s, the concentration of dissolved oxygen in Abrahams Creek near Dallas was measured to be 9.8 milligrams per liter (0.0098 oz/cu ft) and the concentration of carbon dioxide ranged from 2.5 to 5.8 milligrams per liter (0.0025 to 0.0058 oz/cu ft).

In the early 1970s, the concentration of magnesium in the waters of Abrahams Creek near Dallas ranged from 2.00 to 3.70 milligrams per liter (0.00200 to 0.00370 oz/cu ft) and the concentration of calcium ranged from 11.00 to 15.00 milligrams per liter (0.01099 to 0.01498 oz/cu ft). The concentration of recoverable iron was once measured to be 160 micrograms per liter (0.00016 oz/cu ft). The concentration of chloride ranged form 8.3 to 17.0 milligrams per liter (0.0083 to 0.0170 oz/cu ft) and the concentration of sulfate ranged from 14.0 to 22.0 milligrams per liter (0.0140 to 0.0220 oz/cu ft).

The peak annual discharge of Abrahams Creek at US Route 11 has a 10 percent chance of reaching 1,200 cubic feet per second (34 m^{3}/s). It has a 2 percent chance of reaching 2,250 cubic feet per second (64 m^{3}/s) and a 1 percent chance of reaching 2,900 cubic feet per second (82 m^{3}/s). The peak annual discharge has a 0.2 percent chance of reaching 5,050 cubic feet per second (143 m^{3}/s).

The peak annual discharge of Abrahams Creek 2,000 feet (610 m) upstream of US Route 11 has a 10 percent chance of reaching 980 cubic feet per second (28 m^{3}/s). It has a 2 percent chance of reaching 1,850 cubic feet per second (52 m^{3}/s) and a 1 percent chance of reaching 2,400 cubic feet per second (68 m^{3}/s). The peak annual discharge has a 0.2 percent chance of reaching 4,200 cubic feet per second (120 m^{3}/s). The peak annual discharge of Abrahams Creek at its mouth has a 10 percent chance of reaching 950 cubic feet per second (27 m^{3}/s). It has a 2 percent chance of reaching 1,650 cubic feet per second (47 m^{3}/s) and a 1 percent chance of reaching 1,950 cubic feet per second (55 m^{3}/s). The peak annual discharge has a 0.2 percent chance of reaching 2,600 cubic feet per second (74 m^{3}/s).

The specific conductance of Abrahams Creek near Dallas ranged from 83 to 185 micro-siemens per centimeter at 25 °C (77 °F) in the early 1970s. The creek's pH was close to neutral, ranging from 6.6 to 7.3. The concentration of water hardness ranged from 36 to 53 milligrams per liter (0.036 to 0.053 oz/cu ft).

As of 2007, the 20-year average annual precipitation rate is 41.63 inches (105.7 cm) per year. The 20-year average annual runoff rate is 3.46 inches (8.8 cm) per year. In the early 1970s, the water temperature of the creek near Dallas in several measurements ranged from 8 to 22 °C (46 to 72 °F).

== Geography and geology ==
The elevation near the mouth of Abrahams Creek is 522 feet (159 m) above sea level. The elevation of the creek's source is between 1,140 and 1,160 feet (350 and 350 m) above sea level. The highest point in the watershed is on Bunker Hill, at slightly over 1,500 feet (460 m) above sea level. The lowest point in the watershed is at the creek's mouth.

There are plains to the north of Abrahams Creek. Wetlands known as the Abrahams Creek Wetlands are in the vicinity of the creek. They consist of several ponds along the side of the creek in Franklin Township, Kingston Township, and Dallas Township. The wetlands are listed on the Luzerne County Natural Areas Inventory. The creek is in entirely in the ridge and valley physiographic province, specifically, the Anthracite Valley Section. The Bunker Hill-Mount Lookout Ridge crosses the watershed and divides it into two drainage basins: the upper Abrahams Creek watershed, which consists of rolling hills, and the lower Abrahams Creek watershed, which is on a natural debris fan and the old floodplain of the Susquehanna River. Between the two is "The Hollow", a narrow canyon flowing through the ridge.

The course of Abrahams Creek has been altered by flood control projects. There is a sediment retention structure on the creek at the lower end of "The Hollow". Large portions of the creek, especially in its lower reaches, have undergone full stream channelization, with the stream channel being hardened by concrete or rock. In West Wyoming, a nearly mile-long stretch is lined with concrete. In the early 20th century, part of the creek above The Hollow had grouted stone walls, which were completed in the 1930s.

In the Abrahams Creek watershed, 94 percent of the rock is interbedded sedimentary rock. The remaining 6 percent is sandstone. The main rock formations in the watershed of Abrahams Creek include the Catskill Formation, the Llwellyn Formation, the Pottsville Group, the Mauch Chunk Formation, and the Pocono Formation. These formations mainly consist of coal, limestone, sandstone, shale, and siltstone. The Catskill Formation mainly occurs in the watershed's upper reaches. The Mauch Chunk Formation, the Pocono Formation, and the Pottsville Group occur under the Bunker Hill-Mount Lookout Ridge. The Llwellyn Formation also occurs there, in addition to underlying the floodplain in the watershed. A considerable area in the watershed has been strip mined.

The main soils in the watershed of Abrahams Creek include the Chenango-Pope-Holly soil, the Lackawanna-Arnot-Morris soil, the Udorthents-Urban Land-Volusia soil, and the Volusia-Mardin-Lordstown soil. The watershed's soils are in mostly the hydrologic soil groups B and C. However, the hydrological soil group D is also present.

== Watershed ==
The watershed of Abrahams Creek has an area of 17.4 square miles (45 km^{2}). The creek's mouth is in the United States Geological Survey quadrangle of Pittston. However, its source is in the quadrangle of Kingston. There are approximately 25 miles (40 km) of open stream channels in the watershed. The creek's watershed is situated in the northeastern part of Luzerne County and occupies portions of nine municipalities: Exeter, Forty Fort, Swoersville, West Wyoming, Wyoming, Dallas Township, Exeter Township, Franklin Township, and Kingston Township. The watershed is described as being hourglass-shaped in the Abrahams Creek Watershed Assessment and Project Prioritization.

A total of 80 percent of the Abrahams Creek watershed is rural and 20 percent is urbanized. The lower reaches of the watershed contain most of the urbanization. Its upper reaches contain second-growth forest, small patches of residential land, linear hedgerows, and agricultural land such as hay pastures, pastures, and farmland. The Bunker Hill-Mount Lookout Ridge is too steep to be developed, but many other areas of the watershed could easily be urbanized. The mining-affected land in the watershed is in West Wyoming.

A total of 51 percent of the watershed of Abrahams Creek consists of forested land. A total of 26 percent of the watershed consists of agricultural land and 18 percent is developed. The remaining 2 percent consists of "disturbed" land.

Abrahams Creek is the main source of flooding in West Wyoming, Forty Fort, and Swoyersville. Sheet flooding can occur when the creek floods over Eighth Street. There is a flood protection project for the creek in West Wyoming. This protection is capable of withstanding 100 year floods. The Slocum Dam, which is upstream of West Wyoming, also helps to reduce flooding on the creek. However, localized flooding and ponding frequently affect its lower reaches. The creek has been experienced extensive modifications, such as narrowing and riprap installation, in The Hollow to accommodate West Eighth Street.

Abrahams Creek flows through Frances Slocum State Park and passes through Frances Slocum Lake, a flood-control lake with a volume of half a billion gallons. Most of the upper reaches of the watershed drain into the lake. The creek is also dammed in this location. The lake was created in 1965 by the construction of an earthen dam across the creek. A pond known as Burketts Pond is on a tributary of the creek. It is partially filled and has a decaying stone dam. If the dam collapsed, damage could potentially reach up to 2 miles (3.2 km) downstream. There are numerous other dammed ponds in the watershed's upper reaches. Historically, wetlands formed the sources of many headwater streams in the area, but many have been drained or flooded by impoundments.

The watershed of Abrahams Creek is continuing to become more developed, but at a slower rate than it has in the past. The lower reaches of the watershed are the most heavily urbanized, while the upper reaches are still largely rural. This has been the case as early 1893. The upper reaches of the watershed have a dendritic drainage system.

Abrahams Creek is one of 19 streams in Luzerne County to be designated for stormwater management.

== History, name, and etymology ==
Abrahams Creek was entered into the Geographic Names Information System on August 2, 1979. Its identifier in the Geographic Names Information System is 1200061. The creek is also known as Abraham Creek, Abraham's Creek, Abram Creek, or Abrams Creek. The name "Abraham's Creek" was once the official name of the creek. It was also referred to by this name in an 1860 map.

Historically, the Mohicans had a settlement on the banks of Abrahams Creek. The creek is named after Abraham, a chief of that village.

Extensive logging and intense agriculture were historically done in the watershed of Abrahams Creek. The area was already beginning to experience road encroachment as early as 1893.

Several bridges have been built over Abrahams Creek. A concrete slab bridge carrying State Route 1021/East Eighth Street was built in 1925. It is 38.1 feet (11.6 m) long and is situated in West Wyoming. A concrete stringer bridge carrying State Route 1010 was constructed over the creek in 1929. This bridge is 30.8 feet (9.4 m) long and is also situated in West Wyoming. A concrete tee beam carrying US Route 11 was built in 1939. It is 39.0 feet (11.9 m) long and is situated in Forty Fort. Another bridge carrying US Route 11 was built in Wyoming in 1953. It is a 14-span steel culvert bridge with a length of 112.9 feet (34.4 m). A 2-span concrete tee beam bridge was constructed over the creek in 1962 in Wyoming. It is 76.1 feet (23.2 m) long and carries State Route 1021. A steel culvert bridge carrying State Route 1044 was built in 1965. It is 22.0 feet (6.7 m) long and situated in Kingston Township. A prestressed box beam bridge carrying State Route 1036/Carverton Road was constructed over the creek in 1976. This bridge is 42.0 feet (12.8 m) long and is situated in Kingston Township. Four bridges over the creek are classified as being structurally deficient, as of 2007.

The entire watershed of Abrahams Creek, including all of the streams and wetlands, has been significantly modified by both historical and modern land uses in the area. The natural surface water hydrology of the watershed was substantially modified by projects of the United States Army Corps of Engineers and the Pennsylvania Department of Environmental Protection from the 1950s until the 1990s. The sediment retention structure in The Hollow was constructed in the 1970s.

Abrahams Creek has a watershed association known as the Abrahams Creek Watershed Association. It was awarded the Watershed Stewardship Award by the Luzerne Conservation District in 2009. The organization also received a $5000 grand from American Water for improving water quality, adding riparian buffers, and other projects. Damaging flooding in 2006 caused the Abrahams Creek Watershed Assessment and Project Prioritization to be created. The creek was used as a reference watershed by the Pennsylvania Department of Environmental Protection when developing a total maximum daily load for the nearby Solomon Creek.

== Biology ==
Nearly all of the watershed of Abrahams Creek is biologically degraded, with the only exceptions being several headwater streams. However, the upper part of the watershed is less severely degraded than the lower reaches.

The drainage basin of Abrahams Creek is designated as a Coldwater Fishery and a Migratory Fishery. Wild trout naturally reproduce in a section of a tributary of the creek in West Wyoming. This stretch is 1.87 miles (3.01 km) long.

There is an herbaceous wetland along Abrahams Creek just upstream of where it enters Frances Slocum Lake. Further to the north, there is a flooded forested wetland. The creek has a substantial riparian buffer upstream of Frances Slocum Lake. The plant species Carex disperma inhabits the area. Bird species such as Virginia rail and Sora inhabit the area as well.

== See also ==
- Mill Creek, next tributary of the Susquehanna River going downriver
- Lackawanna River, next tributary of the Susquehanna River going upriver
- List of rivers of Pennsylvania
