= Allen Morgan (ornithologist) =

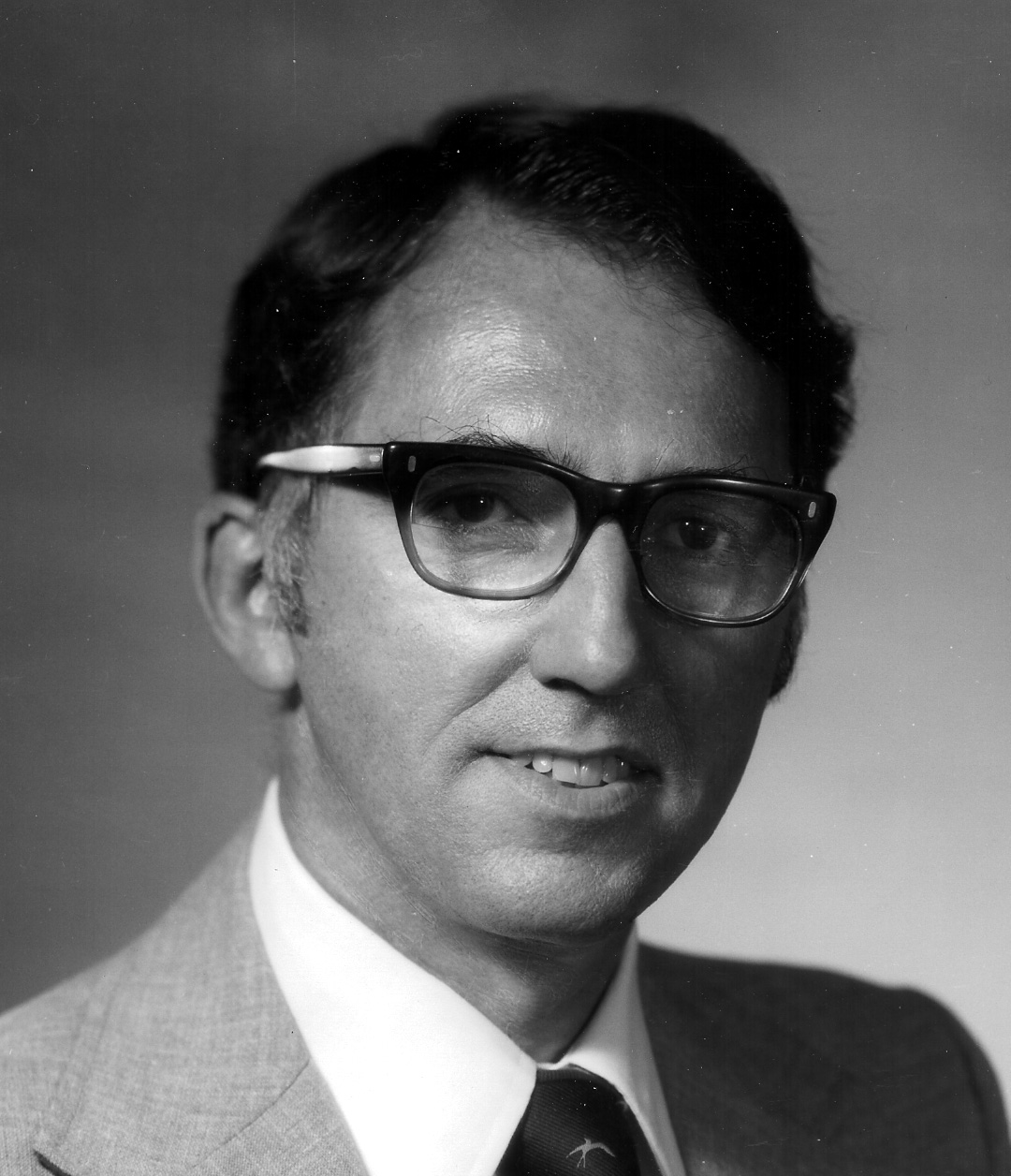

Allen Hungerford Morgan (August 12, 1925 – May 13, 1990) was an ornithologist, environmental advocate, and founder of Sudbury Valley Trustees.

== Ornithologist ==
A protégé of Ludlow Griscom, Morgan's life list comprised more than 600 different birds. He saw the very first black-backed gull ever recorded in the Sudbury Valley. Morgan was also a member of a team of three birders who sighted North America's first cattle egret in April 1952.

== Education ==
Morgan attended Wayland public schools, Mount Prospect School for Boys in Waltham, and Weston High School in Weston, Massachusetts.

In early 1943, Morgan left high school halfway through his senior year at Weston High School to enter Bowdoin College. He joined the United States Marine Corps Reserve in February, and was employed by the United States Fish and Wildlife Service during May and June, working on a gull control project along the Maine coast. He was called to duty by the Marine Corps in July 1943 and was assigned to officer training at Dartmouth College. He served in the Marine Corps in North and South Carolina, Virginia, and California from 1944 to 1946.

== Career ==
Following graduation from Bowdoin in 1947 with a Bachelor of Science in biology, Morgan took a job as an insurance underwriter at Aetna Casualty & Surety Company in Hartford, Connecticut. He left Hartford in 1950 to partner with his father, a life insurance salesman in Boston, Massachusetts, but was recalled to the Marine Corps later in the year. He resigned his commission with the Marine Corps and returned to the life insurance business in 1951. He received his Chartered Life Underwriter (CLU) designation from The American College in 1957.

Morgan wrote scripts for several of Richard Borden's films, leading to his own interest in wildlife photography. He began to shoot his own 16 millimeter films and sold footage to the Disney Company. Morgan lectured extensively (logging in excess of 100 speaking engagements during some years). He called his presentation "Conservation is Common Sense".

== Sudbury Valley Trustees ==
Morgan began a campaign to preserve "open space" for people, and habitats for wildlife in 1953. During that year, working with six friends, he founded the Sudbury Valley Trustees, Inc. (SVT), a nonprofit organization whose mission is to conserve land and protect wildlife habitat in the Concord, Assabet, and Sudbury river watersheds in eastern Massachusetts for the benefit of present and future generations.

== Massachusetts Audubon Society ==
In 1956 Richard Borden, the newly appointed president of the Massachusetts Audubon Society, asked Morgan to join its board of directors. Morgan was appointed Audubon's fifth executive vice president less than a year later in November, 1957.

Under Morgan's stewardship, Mass Audubon established its first scientific staff and oversaw its transition from a bird watching and educational group of 4,500 members and 65 permanent staff in 1957 to the largest and most influential conservation organization in the region with a permanent staff of 145 and nearly 28,000 members by the time he left in 1980. Morgan expanded educational programs, established numerous wildlife sanctuaries, and expanded Mass Audubon's nature centers. Morgan traveled widely on behalf of Mass Audubon and lobbied successfully for conservation legislation at both the state and federal level.

Mass Audubon established the Allen Morgan Award for Lifetime Achievement in 1990 as a tribute to Morgan. Mass Audubon awards this prestigious prize to "an individual who demonstrates the dedication, passion, and daring that Morgan exhibited in protecting the natural world."

== Positions ==
Morgan served on the Wayland Planning Board from 1958 to 1972. He founded the Wayland Conservation Commission in 1959, serving as its chairman until 1972. He was a member of the Massachusetts Legislative Oversight Committee on Water Pollution in 1966. Morgan was chairman of the Governor Francis W. Sargent's Committee for Reorganizing the Massachusetts Department of Natural Resources from 1969 to 1971. He served on or consulted with a number of environmental committees, boards, and government commissions, including the Sudbury Valley Trustees, The Environmental Policy Center (Washington, D.C.), the Center for Energy Policy, the New England Wildflower Preservation Society, the Wayland Conservation Commission, the Elbanobscot Foundation, Inc., the National Wildlife Federation, the national Rural Environment and Conservation Advisory Board—Department of Agriculture, the Massachusetts Conservation Council, and the Coastal Wetland Action Committee. In 1972, Morgan was one of three representatives of the United States at the United Nations Conference on the Human Environment in Stockholm.

== SVT full time ==
After Morgan's retirement from Mass Audubon in 1980, he was chosen a Fellow of Saybrook College at Yale University. In 1981, he turned his attention full-time to SVT as its first executive director. He expanded the SVT membership base, hired a staff, and supervised the acquisition of significant amounts of open space throughout the Sudbury River watershed while continuing his lecturing, consulting, and writing until his death.

Morgan died from prostate cancer at the Lahey Clinic in 1990, a few months prior to his planned retirement in August. He is buried at the Old North Cemetery in Wayland.

Morgan is remembered annually by SVT when it gives the Morgan Volunteer Award to a volunteer who has distinguished themself on behalf of SVT.

== Honors and awards ==
- Bowdoin College, Honorary Doctor of Science
- University of Massachusetts Amherst, Honorary Doctor of Science
- American International College, Honorary Doctor of Laws
- American Motors national Conservation Award
- The Public Relations Society of America, Outstanding Citizen Award
- The National Council of State Garden Clubs, Silver Seal Award
- The New England Wild Flower Society Award for Outstanding Service to Conservation
- The Trustees of Reservations Conservation Award
- Middlesex News 1989 Man of the Year
- United States Environmental Protection Agency, Environmental Masters Award
- Thoreau-Muir Wilderness Prize of the Walden Earthcare Congress
- Center for Environmental Intern Programs, Founder's Award
