= Wyoming Area School District =

Pennsylvania public school district

Coordinates: 41.32358°N 75.80961°W

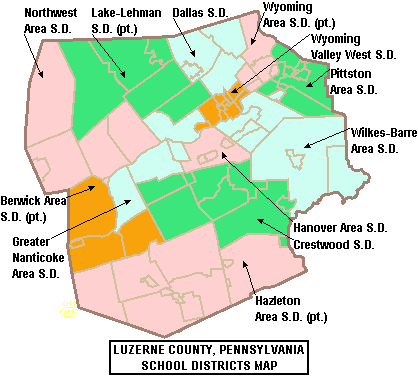
- Location of Wyoming Area School District in Luzerne County, Pennsylvania

Address
- 252 Memorial Street Exeter, Luzerne County, Pennsylvania, 18643-2659; United States

Students and staff
- District mascot: Warrior
- Colors: Green and Gold

Other information
- Website: wyomingarea.org

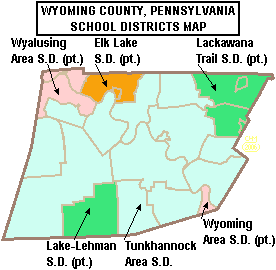
Location of Wyoming Area School District in Wyoming County, Pennsylvania

The Wyoming Area School District is a midsized, suburban, public school district that is located in northeastern Luzerne County and southeastern Wyoming County, Pennsylvania. It is situated midway between Wilkes-Barre and Scranton.

One of the 500 public school districts of Pennsylvania, this district is composed of six municipalities: West Pittston, Exeter, Wyoming, West Wyoming, Harding and Falls Township, covering approximately 26 square miles (67 km^{2}) primarily in Luzerne County. According to 2000 federal census data, it served a resident population of 20,386.

The Wyoming Area School District operates four schools from grades K-12 consisting of the Secondary Center (Grades 6–12) in Exeter, the Tenth Street Elementary School, Primary center, (Grades 1–3) in Wyoming, the John F. Kennedy Elementary School, kindergarten center, (Kindergarten) in Exeter, and the Montgomery Avenue Elementary School, Intermediate center, (grades 4–5) in West Pittson. Wyoming Area offers a full-day kindergarten.

== History ==
In 1966, the school districts of West Pittston, Exeter, Wyoming, and West Wyoming were merged to create the Wyoming Area School District.

== Demographics ==
The 2010 federal census reported a decline of the district's resident population to 19,386 people. In 2009, district residents' per capita income was $18,034, while the median family income was $43,321. In the Commonwealth of Pennsylvania, the median family income was $49,501 and the United States median family income was $49,445, in 2010.

By 2013, the median household income in the United States rose to $52,100.

== Extracurriculars ==
Wyoming Area School District's students have access to a variety of clubs, activities and an extensive sports program.

=== Academic competition teams achievements ===
- The Wyoming Area High School Academic Team won the LIU18 Championship sponsored by LIU18 at King's College in 2003 and 2004 and competed in the Pennsylvania Academic Championship in Harrisburg.
- The Wyoming Area Scholastic Scrimmage Team competed in WVIA TV's Scholastic Scrimmage and was first runner up in the Grand Championship in 2007 and 2009. The 2009 team competed at the Pennsylvania Academic Competition in Harrisburg and placed seventh. The 2010 team won the LIU18 Championship and the Grand Championship and competed at PAC. The 2011 team won the LIU18 Championship and qualified for PAC.
- The Wyoming Area Middle School Academic Team has won Scranton Preparatory School's Young Scholars Program in 2005, 2007, 2008 and 2009 and 2011. In 2006, the team finished second.
- Wyoming Area Middle School students were state champions in the Crave the Wave event at the 2009 State Science Olympiad Competition held at Juniata College.
- Wyoming Area High School placed 8th at the State Science Olympiad competition in 2009 while the Middle School team placed 16th.
- Wyoming Area Middle School and High School Science Olympiad teams both placed second at the regional Science Olympiad competition held at Penn State Wilkes-Barre in 2009.
- Wyoming Area Middle School finished in 11th place out of 150 schools in Pennsylvania in the State Science Olympiad Competition in 2008.
- Wyoming Area Middle School was the champion in the regional Science Olympiad competition in 2008 while the high school placed second.
- Wyoming Area High School was the regional Science Olympiad competition champion in 2005 and placed in the top ten in the Pennsylvania State Science Olympiad Competition in 2006 and 2007.
- Wyoming Area Shore Bowl team, competing in the Shore Bowl sponsored by Rutgers University and the National Ocean Sciences Bowl, finished second in 2003, 2004, 2005, 2006 and 2008 and finished first and undefeated in 2007. The team competed in the National Championship at Stoneybrook University.
- The Wyoming Area JETS Team, competing at Penn State Wilkes-Barre, finished first in their region in 2009 and well as first in the state of Pennsylvania. The team's score also placed them fifth in the nation. Previously in 2005, the team had finished in second place.
- The Wyoming Area Kane Physics team competing in the Kane Physics Contest at the University of Scranton finished first in the competition in 2004, 2007, 2008, and 2009 while also placing second in 2005.
- Wyoming Area has finished first in the Bloomsburg University Science Iditarod for four consecutive years from 2005 to 2008. In 2008 Wyoming Area won not only the Grand Championship but was first in Geosciences, Biology, Chemistry and Physics.
- Between 1983 and 2009, Wyoming Area High School had 30 first or second places finishes in the American Chemical Society Contest sponsored by the Susquehanna Valley Section of the American Chemical Society. In 2009, Wyoming Area had three first-place winners.
- Wyoming Area High School took the top three places in the University of Scranton's 2009 Brain Bee. The High School also won the competition in 2005 and 2006 and has placed in the top ten three times at the National Brain Bee in Baltimore Maryland.

PIAA School Directory

=== Athletics ===
The District funds:

Boys:

- Baseball - AAAA
- Basketball- AAAA
- Cross Country - AA
- Football - AAA
- Golf - AA
- Indoor Track and Field - AAAA
- Lacrosse - AA
- Soccer - AA
- Swimming and Diving - AA
- Tennis - AA
- Track and Field - AAA
- Wrestling - AA

Girls:

- Basketball - AAAA
- Cross Country - AA
- Field Hockey - A
- Golf - AA
- Indoor Track and Field - AAAA
- Lacrosse -
- Soccer (Fall) - AA
- Softball - AAAA
- Swimming and Diving - AA
- Tennis - AA
- Track and Field - AAA
- Volleyball - AAA

Junior High School Sports:

Boys:

- Baseball
- Basketball
- Cross Country
- Football
- Soccer
- Track and Field
- Wrestling

Girls:

- Basketball
- Cross Country
- Field Hockey
- Softball
- Track and Field

According to PIAA directory July 2013

Football has traditionally been the school's most competitive program. In addition to having won the Wyoming Valley Conference numerous times, In 2019, the program won the PIAA Class 3A State Championships against Central Valley (21–13), PIAA District 2 AA titles in 1992, 1998, and 2012, and the PIAA District 2 AAA title in 2003. Several football players have also gone on to play NCAA Division I Football at schools such as Brown University, Bucknell University, Columbia University, Sacred Heart University, Cornell University, the University of Massachusetts Amherst, Penn State University, William and Mary, and Yale University. Paul Marranca, the head coach at Wyoming Area for 27 seasons (1976–86, 1992–2007), was inducted into the Pennsylvania Scholastic Football Coaches Association Hall of Fame in 2010.

Baseball is also a major sport at Wyoming Area and students have been recruited by schools such as Bucknell University and Temple University to play at their institution. In the 2006–2007 school year, the Wyoming Area golf team took a perfect record of 12-0 into the playoffs. Other sports include basketball, volleyball, soccer, field hockey, cross country, swimming, track and field, ice hockey and tennis. Wrestling is also offered.

=== Programs, Clubs, and Organizations ===
The Wyoming Area Secondary Center provides its students with various extracurricular activities aside from sports. These activities include Gardening Club, Coding Club, Chess Club, Key Club, Builder's Club, Student Council, Art Club, FBLA, SADD, TATU, Marching Band, Concert Band, Indoor Winds, Chorus and Drama. Students may bf also participate in Young Scholars, Scholastic Scrimmage, Brain Bee, Shore Bowl, Science Olympiad, American Chemical Society Contest, Bloomsburg University Science Iditarod, Kane Physics Competition, JETS Contest, Envirothon and History Day. The Journalism Club, Yearbook, and the WAVE (Warrior Audio Visual Entertainment) allow students to showcase their creative writing and reporting skills.

=== 2017 Graduation Incident ===
On June 16, 2017, Valedictorian Peter Butera gave a graduation speech that criticized the school's student government structure, claiming that the student body president's role (which Butera also served) was to be a "party planner". Before he could finish his speech, however, he was abruptly cut off by the school. A clip of this went viral, with the school district receiving universal backlash. After graduating From Villanova University (Charles Widger School of Law), Butera then went on to join the Wyoming Area school board on July 25, 2023.
