= As a Jew: Reclaiming Our Story from Those Who Blame, Shame, and Try to Erase Us =

2025 book by Sarah Hurwitz

- Author: Sarah Hurwitz
- Language: English
- Subject: Judaism, antisemitism, Jewish identity
- Publisher: HarperOne
- Publication date: September 9, 2025
- Pages: 320
- ISBN: 978-0-06-337497-3

As a Jew: Reclaiming Our Story from Those Who Blame, Shame, and Try to Erase Us is a nonfiction book by American author Sarah Hurwitz. It was published by HarperOne on September 9, 2025. The book explains Jewish identity, antisemitism, Jewish history and practices in an effort to inspire readers during this period of rising antisemitism and differing views.

== Background ==
Hurwitz, a graduate of Harvard University and Harvard Law School, worked as a speechwriter during the Democratic presidential campaigns of John Kerry in 2004 and Hillary Clinton in 2007. She then became a White House speechwriter, for both former President Barack Obama and former First Lady Michelle Obama from 2009 to 2017.

After leaving the White House Hurwitz started studying Judaism more closely as an adult, which led to her write her first book, Here All Along: Finding Meaning, Spirituality, and a Deeper Connection to Life- in Judaism which was published in 2019. This was named a finalist for two 2019 National Jewish Book Awards and for the 2020 Sami Rohr Prize for Jewish Literature.

Her experiences led her to examine her Jewish identity and the ways antisemitism and assimilation have shaped Jewish life.

Hurwitz said in interviews that her study of Jewish texts and traditions and her experiences during the COVID-19 pandemic, especially as a hospital chaplain, influenced the development of the book. Knowing the thinking behind the rituals and traditions helped understand them.

== Content ==
The title of the book refers to the expression "as a Jew", which is often used to introduce statements or justify arguments made from a Jewish perspective.

In the book, Hurwitz recounts her childhood experiences with Judaism and her later in life efforts to learn more about Jewish traditions and texts. She examine the historical development of antisemitism and its influence on Jewish attitudes toward identity and assimilation. She argues that understanding antisemitism requires looking beyond the Holocaust to its longer historical development and discusses the implications of this history for contemporary Jewish life. Hurwitz also addresses contemporary antisemitism. Discussing the prevalence of anti-Jewish incidents following the October 7, 2023, attack on Israel, she writes: “Relying on incident counts can be like trying to measure humidity with a bucket, as if it were rain". The book also addresses Zionism and Israel. In one chapter, Hurwitz argues against describing Zionism as inherently colonialist or racist, while also acknowledging what she describes as serious flaws in Israel.

== Reception ==
Kirkus Reviews described As a Jew as an examination of Jewish identity in 21st-century America and praised its combination of personal experience, historical research, and Jewish tradition.

Publishers Weekly included the book among its best religion books of 2025. Its review described Hurwitz's return to Jewish faith and examined the pressures affecting contemporary American Judaism, such as antisemitism, assimilation, Israel, and criticism of Israeli government actions.

A Commentary review discussed Hurwitz's arguments about antisemitism, Jewish identity, Israel, and contemporary political divisions.

A Peninsula Press review examined Jewish identity in the diaspora, focusing on Hurwitz's changing relationship with Judaism and her discussion of antisemitism, Israel, and Zionism.

Marc Katz of the Jewish Book Council praised Hurwitz's accessible discussion of antisemitism, including Christian antisemitism, assimilation, Jewish practice, Israel, and anti-Zionism.

As a Jew debuted on The New York Times Best Seller list on September 25, 2025.

== Awards ==
As a Jew received the Myra H. Kraft Memorial Award for Contemporary Jewish Life and Practice at the 75th National Jewish Book Awards for books published in 2025.

It has also won these awards:

- Natan Notable Book Award Winner
- Rabbi Sacks Book Prize Finalist
- Publisher's Weekly Best Books of 2025, Religion
- Honorable Mention, Religion News Service 10 Top Religion & Spirituality Books of 2025

== See also ==
- Jewish identity
- Antisemitism
- Jewish assimilation
- Zionism
