= Wayland High School =

Massachusetts high school

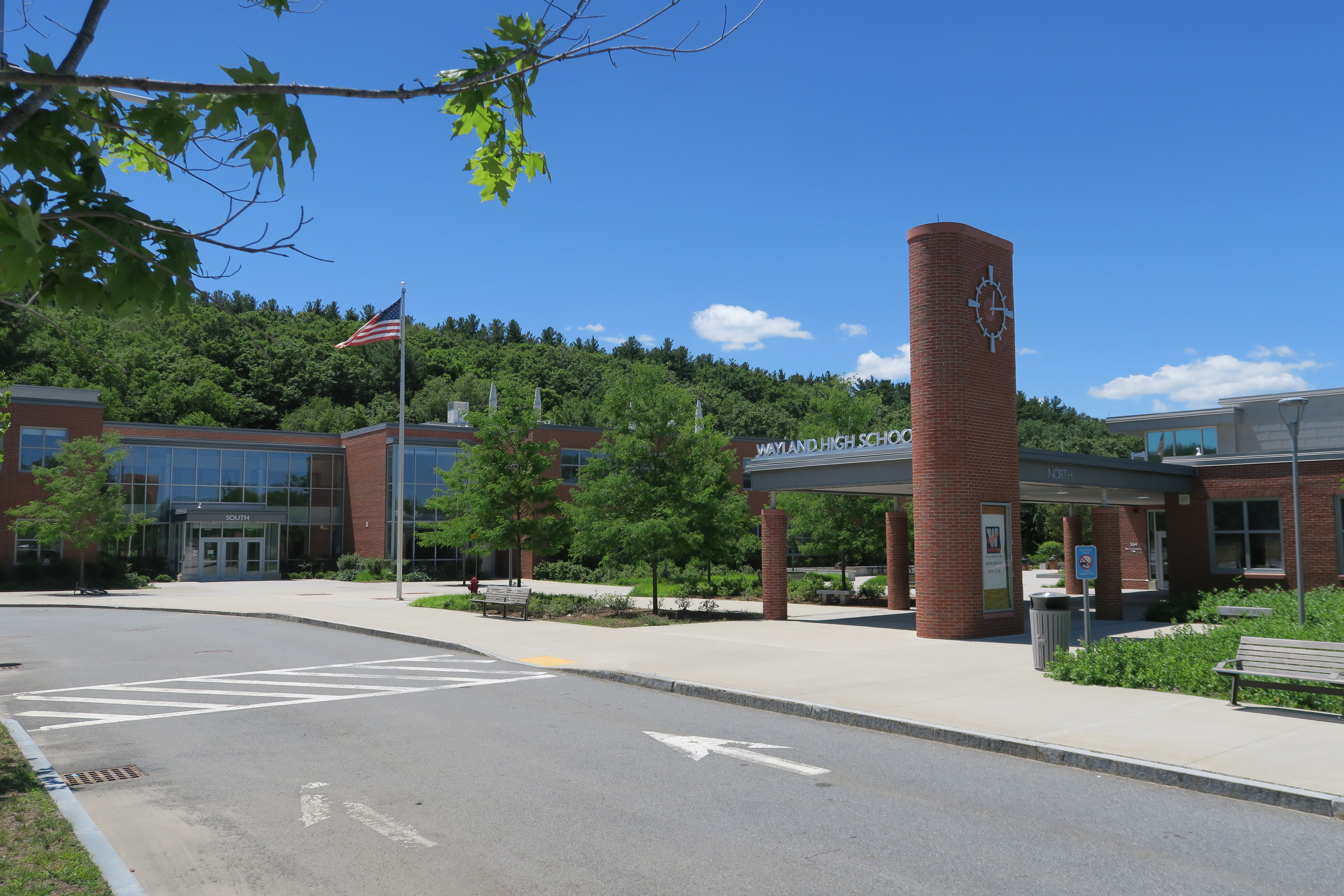
- Wayland High School

Location
- 264 Old Connecticut Path; Wayland, Massachusetts 01778; United States; 42°20′29.2″N 71°22′23.1″W

Information
- Type: Public high school
- Motto: Personal and civic responsibility, love of learning, and empathy for others.
- Established: 1854
- Principal: Allyson Mizoguchi
- Teaching staff: 74.35
- Grades: 9–12
- Enrollment: 824 (2023-2024)
- Student to teacher ratio: 11.03
- Colors: Orange; Black
- Team name: Warriors
- Rival: Weston
- Newspaper: Wayland Student Press Network
- Website: whs.wayland.k12.ma.us

Wayland High School is the public high school for the town of Wayland, Massachusetts, United States. During the 2022-2023 school year, there were 824 students enrolled at the high school.

== History ==
=== Early history (1854–1951) ===
The first public high school in Wayland was opened in the 1854–1855 school year at 55 Cochituate Road. However, "Classes were suspended in 1859 and again in 1862 because the town was unwilling to vote funds to support a high school."

In 1873 the consolidated Cochituate School was opened to house both older and younger students, but in 1896, due to crowding and rundown buildings, The Center School was built. The school "welcomed students in grades 1 to 12 in 1897. It served as a high school until 1936, and as a junior high school until 1961."

In the 1930s, again due to overcrowding, a new building (now the Wayland Town Building) was constructed behind the Trinitarian Church using federal grant money from the National Industrial Recovery Act of 1933. "[T]he final construction was for a four-classroom building with no basement due to the high water table, all to accommodate 250 students. The plans showed a central building of colonial design with two small wings. Additional wings were built – a gymnasium and cafeteria wing on the north side in 1948 and a classroom wing on the south side in 1951."

=== The Cold War and WHS (1951–1966) ===
During the suburban post-World War II population boom Wayland's population more than doubled (from 4,400 to 10,200 between 1950 and 1960). This new wave of residents included many well-educated individuals: doctors, lawyers, businessmen, who wanted an education for their children that was as professional as theirs. This, combined with overcrowding at the high school led to the formation of the School Building Committee.

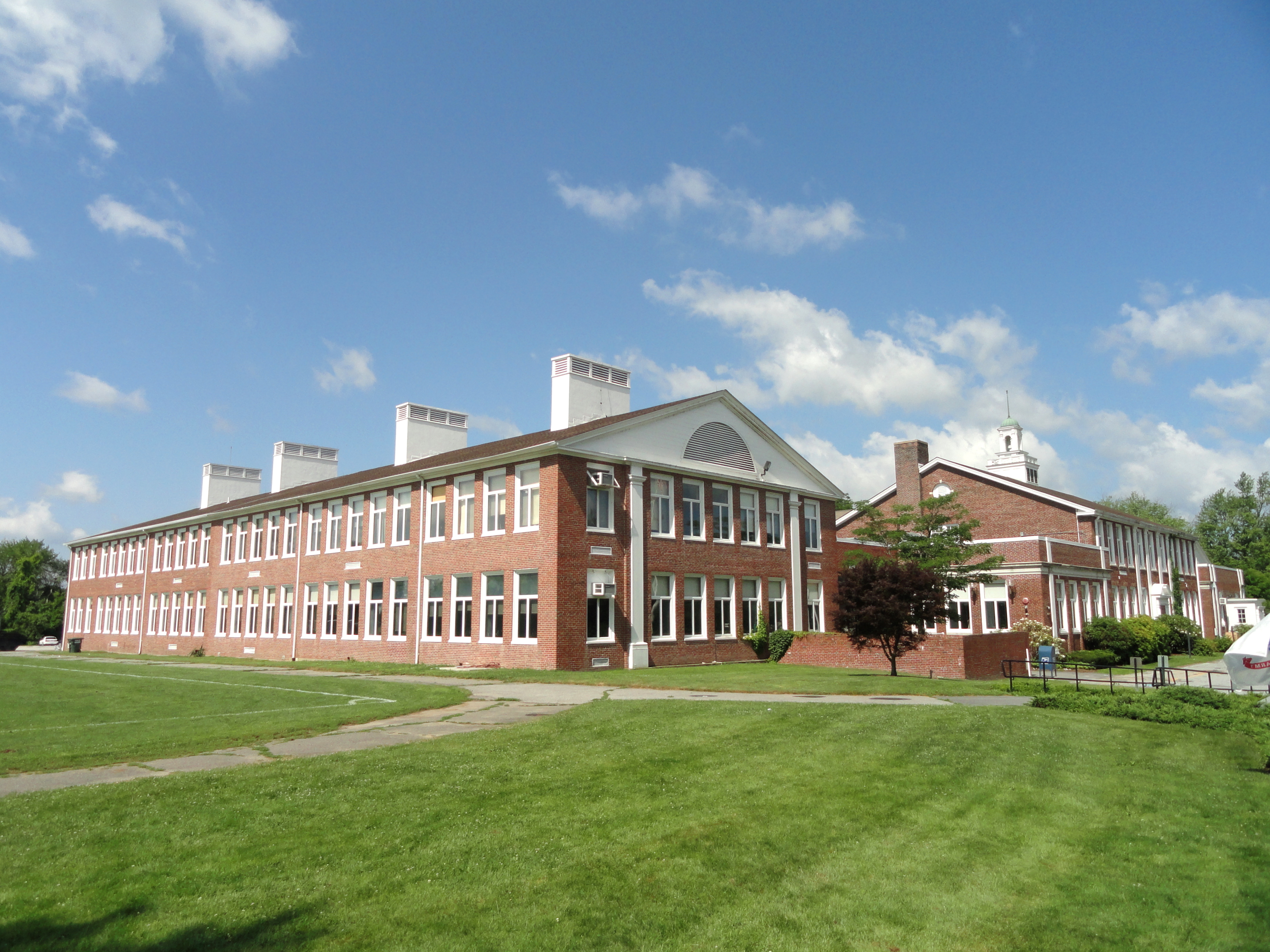
Wayland High School (1933–1960) now the Town Building

Educational consultants Cambridge Consultants, Inc. of Boston were hired to help the town determine what educational changes and structural changes were needed to make the new high school better than the last. At the same time there was a nationwide push to focus on math and science education due the launch of Sputnik. In his 1957 annual report, superintendent Edward J. Anderson cited Sputnik as the reason why math and science needed more attention.

The groundbreaking ceremony for Wayland High School's new open campus was held on April 25, 1959. The campus was designed by Herbert Gallagher and John "Chip" Harkness of The Architects' Collaborative, who were hired by the Town of Wayland in January 1958; the two were assisted by the renowned architect Walter Gropius.

When the high school opened in the fall of 1960, it was hailed for its innovative design. In November 1960 The Architectural Forum wrote, “Probably the most talked-about school plant in the U.S. this fall is a collection of five flat-roofed buildings and a big white dome set down in a green pasture some 16 miles west of Boston." The school received an enormous amount of attention from the press. Featured in Life magazine, Time magazine, The Architectural Forum, The New York Times, and The Boston Globe, it was identified as a leader of the advancement of education.

=== Expansion and renovation (1966–2000) ===
In 1966, an English Building (later the Math-English Building) was built behind the Math-Science Building at the rear of the campus. This was followed six years later, in 1972, by the construction of an Administration/Media Center building in the front of the school, with renovations to areas in the Commons and Arts Buildings previously occupied by the administration and library spaces now relocated to the new building.

In 1968 Wayland became a METCO Community when, "nine students from Dorchester and Roxbury became our community’s ground-breakers, including eight freshmen and one sophomore, Elliott Francis, who would go on to become Wayland's first METCO graduate in 1971."

In November 1973 Aerosmith played one of their first concerts in Wayland's field house.

Between 1990 and 1992, Wayland Public Schools undertook renovations to all of its school buildings, including a $6.2 million renovation to Wayland High School. The scope of the project included replacing outdated building systems, updates to lighting, ceilings, flooring, and selected classroom modifications.

=== New building (2001–present) ===
In late 2001, the Town of Wayland signed Dore & Whittier Architects to come up with concepts for a larger, modern high school. However, in 2003, the Commonwealth of Massachusetts announced that it would put a moratorium on its state building assistance program. With state funding uncertain, the vote to proceed with the schematic designs for the Dore and Whittier proposals was defeated at a Town Meeting. In April 2003, the firm withdrew from the project.

In 2009, Wayland voters approved a new, $70.8 million, three-building campus designed by HMFH Architects, Inc. Construction of the new school was completed at the end of November 2011, and occupancy by the student body began January 3, 2012. In February 2012, with the exception of the Field House, all of the original high school buildings were demolished.

== Academics ==
Wayland High School crest

Students at Wayland High School are required to take courses in English, Social Studies, Mathematics, Science, Wellness, and Fine Arts in order to graduate. Courses are offered at the Advanced Placement, Honors, college, and Introductory level. Since the Class of 2022, Wayland High School only calculates unweighted GPAs.

The vast majority of students pursue post-secondary education after leaving WHS. 92% of the class of 2022 planned on attending either a 4-year college, 2-year college, or prep school. In the past five years the top schools where students have matriculated include: Boston College, Boston University, Clark University, Harvard University, Northeastern University, Syracuse University, Tufts University, University of Massachusetts Amherst, University of Massachusetts Lowell, University of Michigan, University of New Hampshire, University of Vermont, University of Wisconsin, and Worcester Polytechnic Institute.

=== Awards and recognition ===
Wayland High School is accredited by the New England Association of Schools and Colleges (NEASC).

In their 2021 rankings, U.S. News & World Report ranked WHS as #16 in Boston, MA Metro Area High Schools, #18 in Massachusetts High Schools, and #539 in National Rankings.

== Fine and performing arts ==
Wayland's fine and performing arts program is supported by the Creative Arts Parents Association (CAPA). Each year CAPA hosts a College A Cappella Night to help fundraise for Wayland's arts programs. Past performers include Tufts University's Beelzebubs, Massachusetts Institute of Technology's Logarhythms, Boston University's Chordially Yours, the UMass Amherst Dynamics, Mount Holyoke College Diversions, and University of Oregon's On the Rocks.

=== Visual arts ===
Wayland offers visual arts classes in drawing, painting, digital art, photography, ceramics, jewelry-making, and metalsmithing. Students are able to join the National Art Honors Society (NAHS) and each year numerous students are presented with gold keys, silver keys, and honorable mentions from the Scholastic Art and Writing Awards. In 2016, eleven WHS students won a record 42 Scholastic Art Awards.

=== Drama ===
Wayland offers courses in acting, improvisation, dramatic arts, and communication studies. Each year the Wayland High School Theater Ensemble (WHSTE) produces three shows a year, including a musical, dramatic stage play/comedy, and a competition prepared for the Massachusetts Educational Theater Guild festival. In addition, one act festival plays for the event "Winter Week" are typically written, acted and directed by students.

=== Music ===
Wayland High School has numerous music performance groups include a String Orchestra, Honors Sinfonia Orchestra, Honors Orchestra, Chorale, Honors Concert Choir, Concert Band, Honors Wind Ensemble, Jazz Band, Honors Jazz Ensemble, and A Capella Groups. The school also offers general music classes in The History of Jazz, Rock, and Rap, Music Theory, Piano, Guitar, and Music Production. WHS also has three, student-run a cappella groups: the coed Madrigals, the all-male Testostertones or "T-Tones", and the all-female Muses.

=== Dance ===
Window Dance Ensemble is Wayland's student dance performance group. Each spring students choreograph and perform dances designed to showcase skills in various styles of dance including jazz, hip-hop, ballet, and tap.

== Athletics ==
Wayland is a member of the Dual County League (DCL) which is part of the Massachusetts Interscholastic Athletic Association (MIAA) and offers a number of athletic opportunities for students. In addition, Wayland also collaborates with athletic rival Weston High School to provide two additional athletic opportunities. The Wayland/Weston Girls Hockey team and the Wayland-Weston crew team.

=== Crew ===
The crew team regularly competes in regattas such as the Head of the Charles, Head of the Schuylkill, and Textile River Regatta.

=== Football ===
In 2006 Wayland's Varsity football team was undefeated and won the Division 1A State Championship ("The Super Bowl") beating Marshfield High School, 28–0. It was the first time in 31 years that Wayland had been to the playoffs and the first Super Bowl win for Wayland. The football team traditionally plays against rival Weston High School on Thanksgiving Day.

=== Wrestling ===
In 2006 coach Gary Chase led the Varsity wrestling team to an "undisputed championship" winning both the individual and dual meet state championships. After that season his son, Sean Chase, became the head wrestling coach. In 2016 the Wrestling Team won both the DCL championship and the Division 3 state championship. In 2019 the Wrestling team lost the DCL championship 36–40 to Westford Academy. In 2020 the Warriors beat Boston Latin to clinch the DCL title and were hoping to win a state championship, however the season was cancelled due to the COVID-19 pandemic.

=== Soccer ===
In 2014 the Varsity Boys Soccer team won the state championship for the first time in 13 years. Then "[i]n both 2016 and 2018, the boys team faced the same opponent in both state championships: Nipmunc Regional High School" winning both championships.

In 2017 the "Wayland girls’ soccer team pulled off a major upset to land their spot in the Semifinals after beating top-seeded Saugus as the 16th seed on November 3" eventually losing to Newburyport in D3 North Semifinals in penalty kicks.

=== Lacrosse ===
Both the Boys and Girls Lacrosse teams made the Division II playoffs in 2018 and both were ranked as the number one seed in their respective tournaments. The Girls team won their Division, beating number two seed Groton-Dunstable 17–8, but fell to Bromfield in the state semi-final 13–10. The Boys team beat rival Lincoln-Sudbury for the first time since 1999 to earn their spot in the playoffs, but ultimately lost during the second round to Concord-Carlise.

=== Swim and dive ===
In 2009 both the boys and the girls Swim and Dive Teams won Division II State titles becoming the first school in Massachusetts history to win championships in the same year. In 2010 and 2019 both teams were state champions again. The boys team has gone on to win subsequent state titles in 2017, 2018, 2019, 2020, 2025 and 2026. The Girls have won 10 state championships overall in 1973, 2006–2010, 2012–2014, and 2019.

=== Tennis ===
The Wayland Boys tennis team is a "perennial power" and won the state championship in 2012, 2014, 2015, 2017, 2022 and 2023. In 2016 the Wayland Wayland Girls tennis team advanced to the MIAA state finals, and in 2017 they won the state championship.

=== Mascot ===
Wayland's mascot is the Warriors. At the end of the 2017 school year, after years of controversy around the logo, the Athletic Advisory Committee voted removed the Native American imagery from the Warriors logo.

== Extracurriculars ==
Wayland High School offers a number of student-led clubs including: Audio-Visual Club, Amnesty International, Anime Club, Art Club, Asian Club, Awareness and Action Against Cancer, Book Club, Climate Committee, Coding Club, Community Service Club, Debate Team, ESports, FBLA (Future Business Leaders of America), Fencing Club, Fishing Club, Foreign Film Club, Green Team, Interact Club, Math Team, Mock Trial, Model UN, Move, National Art Honor Society, National Honor Society (NHS), Outdoorsman Club, Paws Club, Philanthropy Club, Philosophy Club, Photography Club, Rubik's Cube Club, Russian Club, Science Olympiad, Sneaker Club, Sports Management, Tear it UP, TedX 2020, Tri-M Music Honor Society, Ultimate Frisbee, Water Warriors, Women in STEM, Women's Empowerment Club, World Language Club, and Yearbook Club.

=== Wayland Student Press Network (WSPN) ===
The Wayland Student Press Network (WSPN) was founded in 2007 and subsequently led to the creation of a journalism class at Wayland High School. WSPN's reporting has won them numerous awards including National Scholastic Press Association "Pacemaker" awards which honors, "the very best scholastic broadcasts, literary arts magazines, newspapers/newsmagazines, online publications, specialty magazines and yearbooks" in 2008–2011, 2013, 2014, 2018, 2020, and 2021. WSPN has also been a Columbia Scholastic Press Association Gold Crown Award winner in 2009-2013 and 2021.

=== Robotics ===
In 2014 a group of students founded a FIRST Robotics Competition team called the "Control Freaks 5735". In 2017 the team won the "Excellence in Engineering Award" at the North Shore Reading Event and in 2019 the team won their first district competition and the Pit Safety Award at the North Shore District Event. Previously, Wayland High School had been home to FRC team "Hurriquake 2349". The team was active from 2008 to 2013.

=== Students Against Destructive Decisions (SADD) ===
In 1981 Robert Anastas, a former Wayland High School counselor and hockey coach, founded Students Against Drunk Driving (SADD), now known as Students Against Destructive Decisions, at Wayland High School. Anastas founded the organization with his students after two boys he coached were killed in car accidents where they had been drinking.

=== Math Team ===
In 2023 the WHS Math team won both the Massachusetts and New England meets in the medium school division.

=== Varsity Mock Trial ===
In 2021 the Wayland High School Mock Trial team received varsity status after being founded at least 25 years prior. The status was sought out by Howard Lenow, an attorney coach who has been with the team for over 15 years. In 2022 the WHS Varsity Mock Trial team won the annual Garden City tournament and received a best witness award.

== Notable alumni ==
- Samuel Adams Wisner, class of 2006, rapper
- Erika Uyterhoeven, class of 2004, politician
- Taylor Schilling, class of 2002, actress (TV series Orange Is the New Black)
- Daniel Lopatin, class of 2000, musician (Oneohtrix Point Never)
- Ryan Sypek, class of 2000, actor (TV series Wildfire)
- Amber Gray, class of 1999, actress and musician best known for portraying Hélène Kuragina in the 2016 Broadway musical Natasha, Pierre, & the Great Comet of 1812.
- Sarah Hurwitz, class of 1995, speechwriter to Hillary Clinton and Barack Obama.
- Vanu Bose, class of 1983, Electrical Engineer, Founder and CEO of Vanu Inc., son of Amar Bose
- Erik Brynjolfsson, class of 1980, economist and inventor. Co-author of The Second Machine Age and other books.
- Gregg Kavet, writer and co-executive producer, Seinfeld
- Alberto Salazar, class of 1976, winner of the Boston Marathon and three-time winner of the New York City Marathon, coach until he was banned for life
- Douglas Jabs, class of 1969, expert in clinical research in the fields of ophthalmology and uveitis
- Charles ‘Buzz’ Bowers (1929–2015), Minor League Baseball player and baseball talent scout.
