= Students Against Destructive Decisions =

Student organisation

- Formerly: Students Against Driving Drunk
- Type: Nonprofit
- Founded: 1981
- Founder: Robert Anastas
- Headquarters: Glendale, Arizona
- Key people: Cara Schrack, Executive Director
- Revenue: $3,284,374 (2025)
- Total assets: $1,356,322 (2025)
- Website: https://www.sadd.org/

Students Against Destructive Decisions (SADD), formerly Students Against Driving Drunk, is an organization whose aim is to prevent incidents from students making potentially destructive decisions. SADD's approach involves young people presenting education and prevention messages to their peers through school and community activities. Projects include peer-led classes and forums, teen workshops, conferences and rallies, prevention education and leadership training, awareness-raising activities and legislative work.

== Mission ==
"SADD empowers and mobilizes students and adult allies to engage in positive change through leadership and smart decision-making."

== History ==
SADD was founded at Wayland High School in Wayland, Massachusetts in 1981 by hockey coach Robert Anastas after a drunk driving incident took the lives of two of the school's hockey players. He and a group of 15 students developed the SADD concept and the Contract for Life. In 1982, SADD went national with offices founded throughout Massachusetts, Arizona, Ohio, North Carolina, Connecticut, New York, New Jersey, Florida, Pennsylvania, West Virginia, and Maine. In 1984, Dear Abby and Ann Landers printed the Contract for Life, suggesting to all readers that they request a copy from SADD. The SADD National office was inundated with 8,000 requests per week for six weeks. Also that year, "Contract for Life: The SADD Story" aired on CBS as a CBS Schoolbreak Special, and Carl Olson, the first SADD president at Wayland High School, was appointed by the Director of Health and Human Services as the only student to a three-year panel studying alcoholism in America.

The following year, SADD offices were established in Germany and Guam. Also in 1985, SADD had its first presidential moment when President Reagan met with SADD students of River Dell High School in New Jersey.

In 1989, SADD offices were established in schools in the Soviet Union. Also that year, the SADD National Board of Directors voted to cease accepting contributions from the alcohol industry.

In 1990, The American College of Physicians awarded the Edward G. Loveland Memorial Award to SADD for its contributions to the health field.

In 1992, William Cullinane became Executive Director of SADD.

The following year, the SADD Board of Directors voted not to accept funds from the alcohol industry.

In 1995, SADD received a letter of commendation from President Bill Clinton. The next year, Margaret Altstaetter, SADD Student of the Year 1995-1996, was invited to participate in the White House Leadership Conference on Youth, Drug Use and Violence.

In 2018, First Lady Melania Trump addressed the SADD National Conference. As part of her Be Best campaign, Mrs. Trump spoke on the importance of kindness, compassion, and positivity.

In 2019, SADD received a grant from the California Department of Alcoholic Beverage Control (ABC) for $311,000. The grant was awarded to focus on educating the community on the dangers of impaired driving.

== Chapters ==
A new name, Students Against Destructive Decisions, was adopted in 1997.

SADD's Board of Directors appointed Penny Wells as its new President and Executive Director in 2000.

SADD launched its National Scholarship Program in 2002, awarding its first two scholarships the following year.

In 2004, Jacqueline Hackett, Executive Committee member of the 2003–2004 SADD National SLC, testified before the Congressional Subcommittee on Education Reform at the hearing "Preventing Underage Drinking: What Works?".

In 2007, SADD attended a special White House event during which President George W. Bush highlighted a decline in youth drug use from 2001 to 2007.

In 2008, SADD partnered with the White House's National Youth Anti-Drug Media Campaign to raise awareness about the link between stress and drug use among teens and about prescription drug use.

In 2010, SADD successfully lobbied for the introduction of the STARS (Students Taking Action for Road Safety) Act. In October, SADD received an international drug abuse prevention award from the Queen of Sweden. Also, The Mentor International Foundation presented SADD with the 2010 Youth Initiative Award for "Mobilizing the Community: Youth Taking the Lead". SADD also took part in the Oprah Winfrey led "No phone zone day".
