= Charles P. Bowers =

American baseball talent scout and pitcher

- Baseball scout
- Born: April 21, 1929; Waltham, Massachusetts, U.S.
- Died: July 31, 2015 (aged 86); East Orleans, Massachusetts, U.S.

Teams
- Boston Red Sox; Los Angeles Dodgers; Philadelphia Phillies

Career highlights and awards
- George Digby Scout of the Year Award (1994); Turk Karam Memorial Award (2002); Halls of Fame Inductions; Wayland High School Athletic Hall of Fame (2006) Professional Baseball Scouts Hall of Fame (2007) Cape Cod Baseball League Hall of Fame (2020)

Charles P. Bowers (April 21, 1929 – July 31, 2015) was an American baseball talent scout and former pitcher in the Minor Leagues. He was born in Waltham, Massachusetts, where the people affectionately called him 'Buzz'.

Bowers was one of four boys born to George F. and Dorothy L. (née Harrington) Bowers. He attended Wayland High School in Massachusetts, where he played as a pitcher in baseball, quarterback in football, and forward in basketball. Following his graduation, he received a baseball scholarship to Michigan State University, appearing primarily in a pitching rotation that included future Hall of Famer Robin Roberts. Eventually, both signed professional contracts with the Philadelphia Phillies.

Listed at 6' 2", 170 lb., the right-handed Bowers played in the Phillies Minor League system in all or part of seven seasons spanning 1950–1954. He attended his first spring training camp in 1950 with the Toronto Maple Leafs club of the International League. He then made a good impression in an exhibition game against the Boston Red Sox, when he forced the great Ted Williams to ground into a double play. While a young man with a promising career, he missed two seasons while serving in the United States Army during the Korean War conflict.

Overall, Bowers posted a 54–44 record with a 3.38 earned run average in 239 pitching appearances, winning at least 10 games in four of his six full seasons. He was solid in his last one, going 14–8 with a 2.93 ERA for Class A Schenectady Blue Jays.

Bowers coached baseball and basketball at his old high school after his professional career ended. He also became the director of physical education and director of athletics of the institution before retiring in 1987. He was a strong advocate for parity in women's sports and developed innovative programs to expose students to lifelong fitness activities – from fencing to fly fishing and skiing. His greatest satisfaction was seeing his students or athletes improve and gain confidence.

Bowers scouted for the Phillies and the Los Angeles Dodgers before being hired by the Red Sox in 1992, stristictly to follow Northeast prospects. After spent 30 years scouting for the Dodgers, he signed future big leaguers Lou Merloni, Carl Pavano, Brian Rose, and Steve Lomasney for the Sox. At this time, Bowers began following Framingham native Merloni, who starred at Providence College and won a batting title in the prestigious Cape Cod League, before becoming an American radio personality in recent times. Bowers scouted the Cape Cod League for over 50 years, and is a member of the league's 2020 Hall of Fame class.

Bowers was honored with the George Digby Scout of the Year Award in 1994 while scouting for the Red Sox. In 2002, he earned the Turk Karam Memorial Award as the New York Professional Baseball Hot Stove League Scout of the Year. Then, in 2006 he gained induction in the Wayland High School Athletic Hall of Fame. and soon thereafter was one of 12 scouts inducted in the 2007 Inaugural Class of the Professional Baseball Scouts Hall of Fame.

Buzz Bowers was a long resident of East Orleans, Massachusetts, where he died in 2015 at the age of 86, following complications from Parkinson's disease. He was survived by his wife of 64 years, Virginia 'Ginny' (Colpitts) Bowers, and four children, eight grandchildren, four great-grandchildren, and 19 nieces and nephews.
