= West Wyoming, Pennsylvania =

Borough in Pennsylvania, US

- Borough
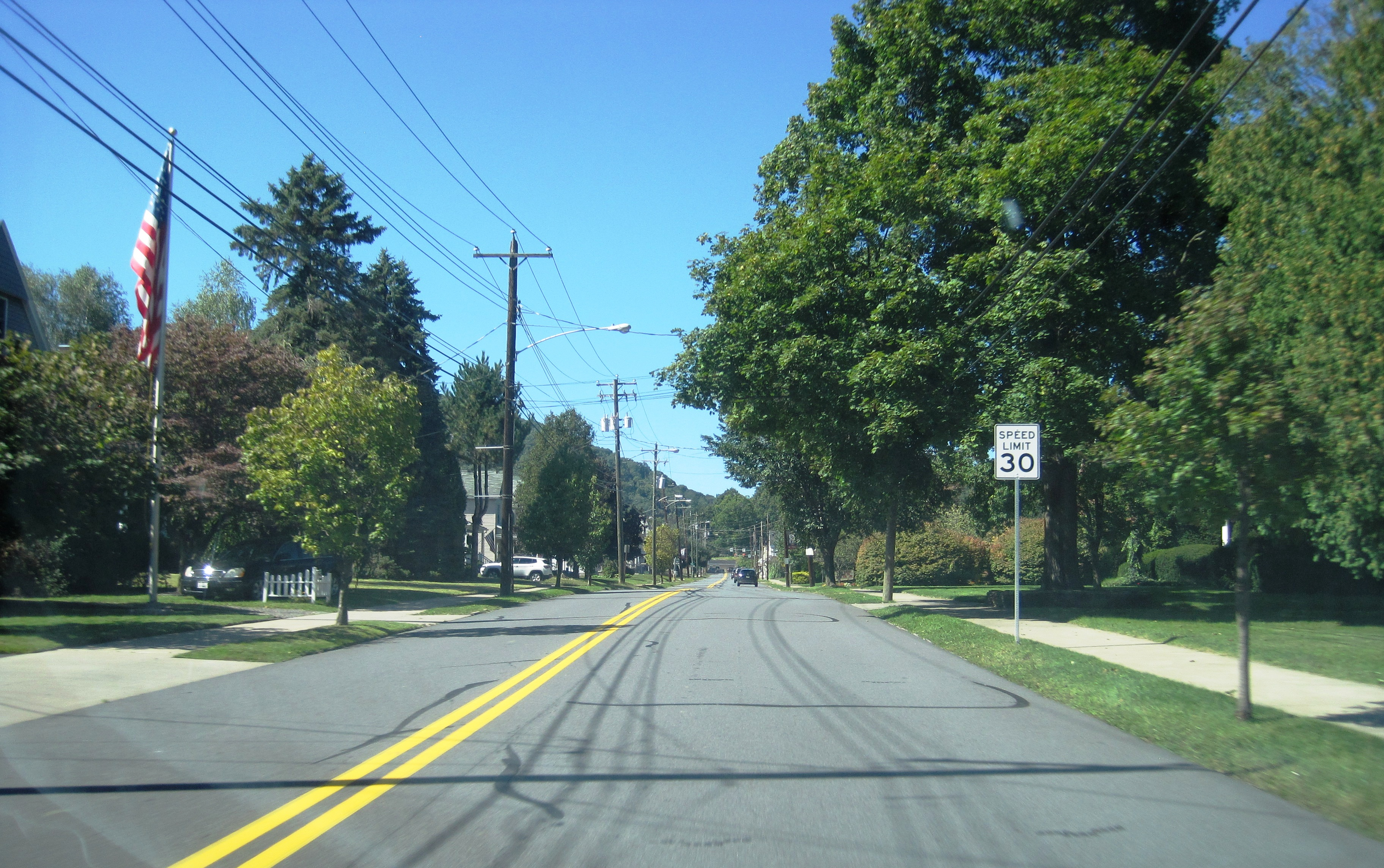
- 8th Street in West Wyoming

- Location of West Wyoming in Luzerne County, Pennsylvania.

- Location within Pennsylvania Location within the United States
- Coordinates: 41°18′50″N 75°51′06″W
- Country: United States
- State: Pennsylvania
- County: Luzerne
- Region: Greater Pittston
- Incorporated: 1898

Government
  - Type: Borough Council
  - Mayor: Randy Colarusso

Area
  - Total: 3.59 sq mi (9.31 km^{2})
  - Land: 3.59 sq mi (9.31 km^{2})
  - Water: 0 sq mi (0.00 km^{2})

Population (2020)
  - Total: 2,631 ▼
  - Estimate (2021): 2,636
  - Density: 744.7/sq mi (287.54/km^{2})
- Time zone: UTC-5 (Eastern (EST))
  - Summer (DST): UTC-4 (EDT)
- Area code: 570
- FIPS code: 42-84272
- Website: www.westwyoming.org

West Wyoming is a borough that is located in Luzerne County, Pennsylvania, United States. The borough is part of the Greater Pittston metro area.

The population was 2,631 at the time of the 2020 census.

== History ==
=== Establishment ===
In 1768, the Susquehanna Company of Connecticut devised a plan to divide the Wyoming Valley into five townships. Each township was to be divided among forty settlers. West Wyoming was originally part of Kingston Township. The community's first forty settlers arrived in February 1769.

Benjamin Carpenter and his brother Gilbert developed several mills along the banks of Abrahams Creek around 1800. The earliest businesses included a grist mill and a saw mill.

=== Borough ===
The community eventually broke away from Kingston Township in 1885. The town was originally known as Carpentersville, Shoemaker's Mills, and New Troy. It was officially incorporated as the Borough of West Wyoming in 1898.

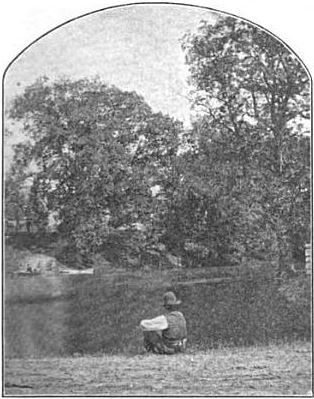
Abrahams Creek in 1878

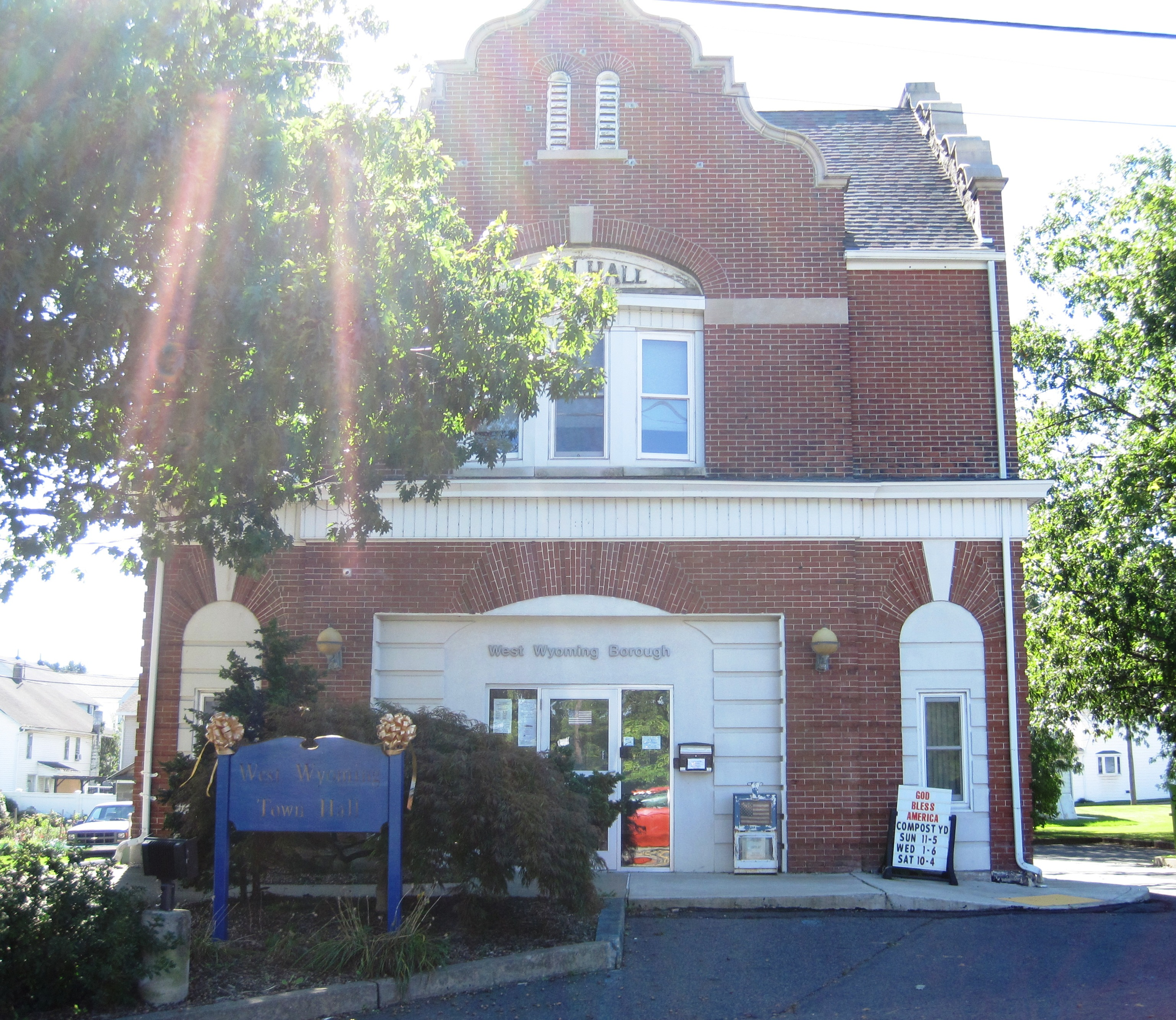
Borough municipal building

== Geography ==
West Wyoming is part of Greater Pittston; it is located at 41°18′50″N 75°51′6″W (41.313780, -75.851640). According to the United States Census Bureau, the borough has a total area of 3.6 square miles (9.4 km^{2}), all land.

The northern and northeastern sections of the borough are mostly made up of thick forests and mountains. Frances Slocum State Park is located nearby. West Eighth Street and Abrahams Creek run through a mountain pass — which links Greater Pittston to the Back Mountain. West Eighth Street intersects with Shoemaker Avenue near the eastern portion of the borough. Most homes and businesses are located in the southern and eastern sections of West Wyoming.

The following communities neighbor West Wyoming: Exeter Township (north), Exeter Borough (northeast, east), Wyoming Borough (southeast), Swoyersville Borough (southwest), and Kingston Township (west, northwest).

== Demographics ==
Historical population
Census	Pop.	Note	%±
1900	1,344		—
1910	1,621		20.6%
1920	1,938		19.6%
1930	2,769		42.9%
1940	2,992		8.1%
1950	2,863		−4.3%
1960	3,166		10.6%
1970	3,659		15.6%
1980	3,288		−10.1%
1990	3,117		−5.2%
2000	2,833		−9.1%
2010	2,725		−3.8%
2020	2,638		−3.2%
2021 (est.)	2,636	▼	−0.1%

As of the census of 2000, there were 2,833 people, 1,183 households, and 822 families residing in the borough. The population density was 780.2 inhabitants per square mile (301.2/km^{2}). There were 1,240 housing units at an average density of 341.5 per square mile (131.9/km^{2}). The racial makeup of the borough was 99.33% White, 0.18% African American, 0.07% Asian, 0.04% Pacific Islander, 0.04% from other races, and 0.35% from two or more races. Hispanic or Latino of any race were 0.25% of the population.

There were 1,183 households, out of which 26.0% had children under the age of 18 living with them, 57.6% were married couples living together, 8.2% had a female householder with no husband present, and 30.5% were non-families. 26.7% of all households were made up of individuals, and 15.0% had someone living alone who was 65 years of age or older. The average household size was 2.39 and the average family size was 2.91.

In the borough the population was spread out, with 20.9% under the age of 18, 5.6% from 18 to 24, 27.3% from 25 to 44, 24.2% from 45 to 64, and 21.9% who were 65 years of age or older. The median age was 42 years. For every 100 females there were 92.7 males. For every 100 females age 18 and over, there were 87.9 males.

The median income for a household in the borough was $37,275, and the median income for a family was $44,214. Males had a median income of $38,398 versus $25,664 for females. The per capita income for the borough was $17,603. About 0.2% of families and 3.8% of the population were below the poverty line, including 1.7% of those under age 18 and 11.6% of those age 65 or over.

== Education ==
It is in the Wyoming Area School District.
