= Sudbury Valley Trustees =

Sudbury Valley Trustees (SVT) is a regional open-space land trust headquartered in Wolbach Farm in Sudbury, Massachusetts, and operates in communities surrounding watersheds within eastern Massachusetts.

The logo of the Sudbury Valley Trustees.

== About ==
SVT is a regional land trust based in Massachusetts. The organization conducts land protection, stewardship, advocacy, and educational activities with private landowners, municipal conservation commissions, local land trusts, other nonprofit organizations, and government agencies. SVT is governed by a volunteer board of directors and is supported by a full-time staff and more than 200 volunteers.

SVT has been accredited by the national Land Trust Accreditation Commission since 2013.

=== Land Protection ===
SVT’s land protection program focuses on identifying and conserving ecologically diverse areas within its service region. Priority efforts include the protection of high-value conservation parcels, properties with community or historical value, and increasing the number of fee-simple acquisitions and land donations to the organization.

=== Stewardship ===
SVT manages its reservation properties to maintain ecological health and provide public access for recreation. Stewardship activities include habitat management, trail maintenance, and implementation of conservation practices aimed at supporting regional biodiversity.

=== Membership and Protected Lands ===
As of January 2026, SVT had about 2,400 members. The organization had helped to protect more than 6,240 acres in 96 SVT-Owned Conservation Areas and 107 Conservation Restrictions. SVT has also contributed to the permanent protection of an additional 6,000 acres (24 km²) now managed by public agencies, including portions of the Great Meadows National Wildlife Refuge. The organization had also helped to protect more than 70 miles of trails that are open for public use without charge.

== History ==
SVT was founded in 1953 by seven residents seeking to prevent the loss of local wildlife habitat. After returning to Wayland, Massachusetts, following service in the Marine Corps during World War II and the Korean War, Allen Morgan observed significant residential and commercial development on land that had previously consisted of forest and farmland. Concerned about the permanent loss of open space, he organized six colleagues (B. Allen Benjamin, Dr. George K. Lewis, Henry Parker, Willis B. Ryder, Richard Stackpole, and Roger P. Stokey) to establish Sudbury Valley Trustees for the purpose of protecting the area’s natural resources.

The founders distributed a form letter inviting residents to join the organization for a membership fee of $3. SVT grew to several hundred members within its first few years. Its early publications highlighted the environmental value of floodplain marshes and contributed to the adoption of the first floodplain zoning regulations in the Northeast. As a result of SVT’s advocacy, most communities in the Sudbury Valley created floodplain zones protecting approximately 6,000 acres (24 km^{2}) without incurring land acquisition costs.

SVT operated entirely through volunteer efforts until 1981, when Morgan became its first executive director. During his tenure, SVT expanded to nearly 2,400 members, a staff of four full-time and four part-time employees, and a portfolio of approximately 60 protected properties totaling about 1,200 acres (4.9 km²) by the time of his death in 1990.

== Board of Directors ==
=== Executive Officers (2025-2027) ===
President	Steve Correia
Vice President	Harry Newell
Treasurer	Lisa Schimmel
Clerk	Peter Martin
Assistant Treasurer	Davnet Conway
Assistant Clerk	Stephanie Mooney

=== Directors At Large ===
Directors
Paul Bakstran
Sherri Cline
Molly Cutler
Rebecca Cutting
Sean Fair
Amy Green
Harry Harding
Ruth Kennedy Sudduth
Eric Klein
John Mastrobattista
Karin Paquin
Richard Perkins
Loring LaBarbera Schwarz
Jim Valone
