= Robert Anastas =

American hockey coach (born 1934)

- Born: 1934 (age 91–92)
- Occupations: Ice hockey coach, educator
- Known for: Founding Students Against Drunk Driving (now Students Against Destructive Decisions)

Robert Anastas (born 1934) is an American former hockey coach and teacher at Wayland High School from Hudson, Massachusetts. Anastas was an All American Football and Ice Hockey player for American International College. He was drafted by the then-Boston Patriots in 1960. After his sports career he joined the Framingham, Massachusetts, school system, where he was awarded the "Massachusetts Teacher of the Year".

Anastas founded Students Against Drunk Driving, now Students Against Destructive Decisions (SADD), in 1981 following the deaths of two students in nonrelated drunk driving crashes. SADD developed into the leading anti-drunk driving program for high school students with over 20,000 chapters in high schools North America, Europe, and New Zealand.

Robert Anastas retired as Founder and Executive Director of SADD, taking the Students Against Driving Drunk name with him. The acronym SADD, which he allowed to be used, continues and is known as Students Against Destructive Decisions although it is not affiliated with Robert Anastas.
