= Mount Prospect School for Boys =

- Mt. Prospect School for Boys
- U.S. National Register of Historic Places
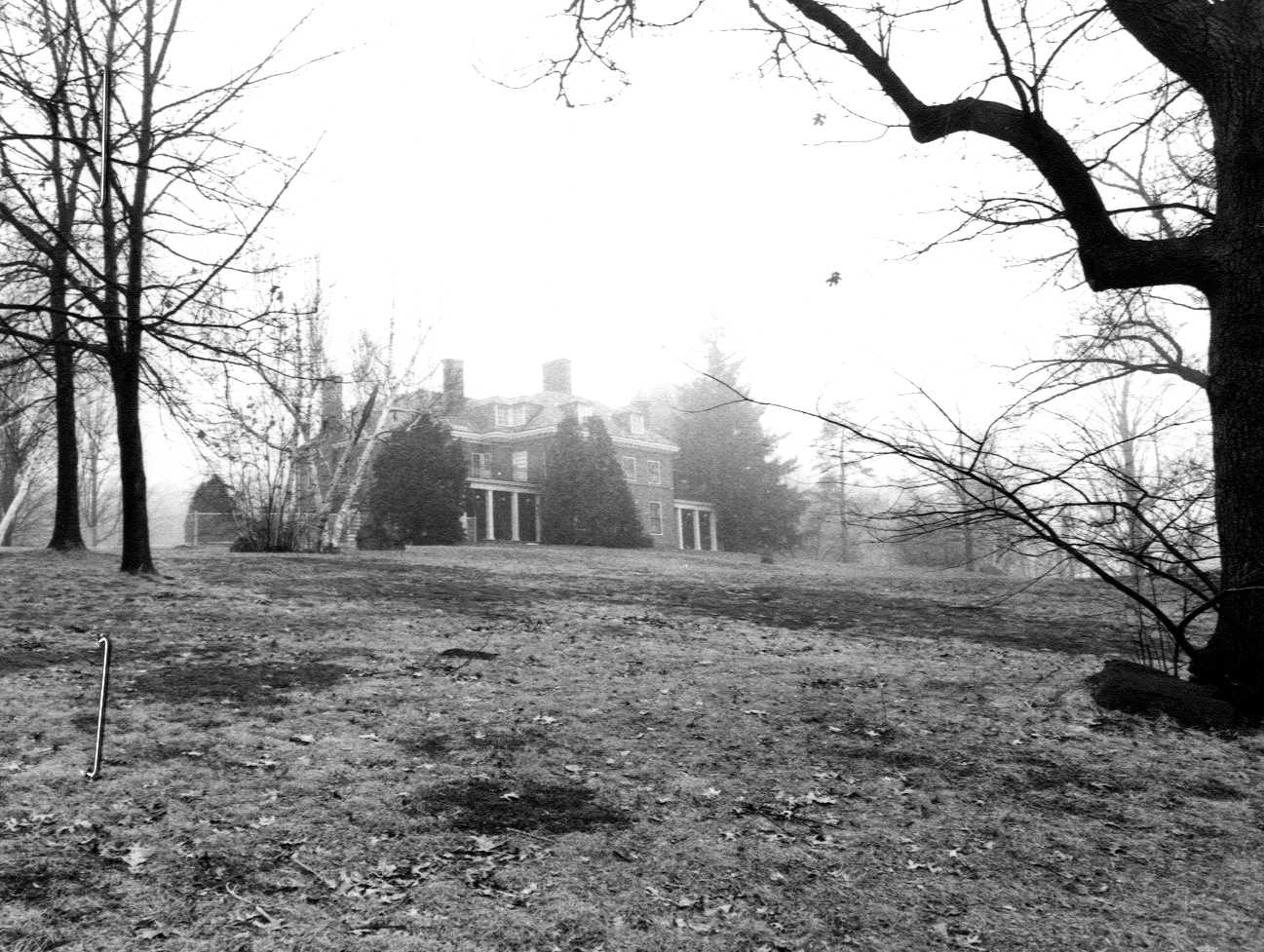
- c. 1984 photo

- Location within Massachusetts Location within the United States
- Location: 90 Worcester Ln., Waltham, Massachusetts
- Coordinates: 42°23′23″N 71°14′39″W
- Built: 1923
- Architectural style: Colonial Revival, Georgian Revival
- MPS: Waltham MRA
- NRHP reference No.: 89001525
- Added to NRHP: March 09, 1990

The Mt. Prospect School for Boys was a historic school at 90 Worcester Lane in Waltham, Massachusetts.

== Purpose ==
It was a large Georgian Revival brick building built in 1923 to house an experimental boys' school.

The school only operated for about ten years, after which the property was converted for use as a nursing home.

== History ==
The school was founded by Arthur Astor Carey (of the noted New York City Astor family), and was headed by Hugo B. Seikel.

The school complex was listed on the National Register of Historic Places in 1990. Sometime thereafter it was demolished.

== See also ==
- National Register of Historic Places listings in Waltham, Massachusetts
