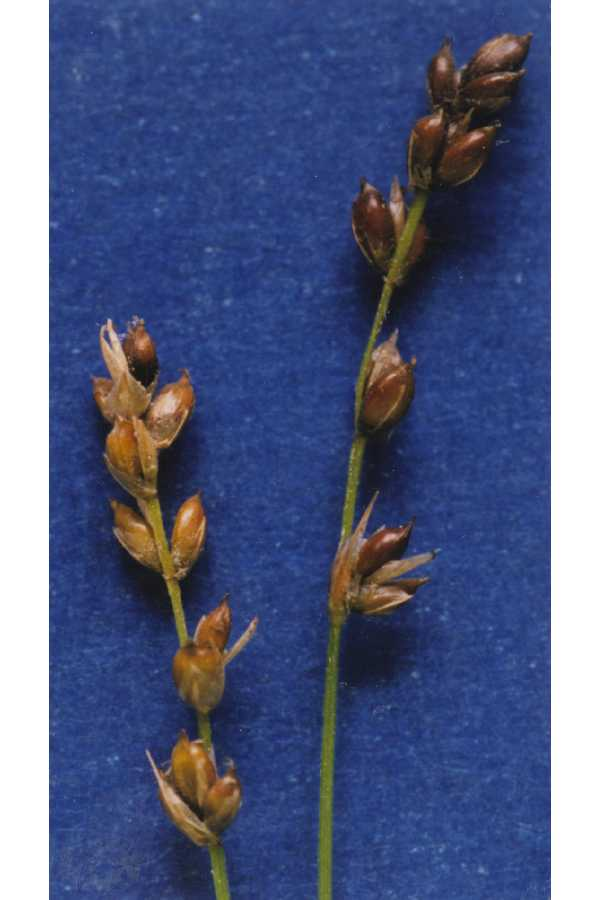

Scientific classification
- Kingdom: Plantae
- Clade: Tracheophytes
- Clade: Angiosperms
- Clade: Monocots
- Clade: Commelinids
- Order: Poales
- Family: Cyperaceae
- Genus: Carex
- Species: C. disperma

Binomial name
- Carex disperma Dewey

Synonyms
- Carex tenella

= Carex disperma =

Species of grass-like plant

Carex disperma is a species of sedge known by the common names softleaf sedge or two-seed sedge. It is native to much of the northern Northern Hemisphere, from Alaska to Greenland, most of Canada and the contiguous United States, and across Eurasia.

== Description ==
Carex disperma grows in many types of wet habitat, such as swamps, meadows, and moist forest understory. This sedge produces thin, nodding stems up to 60 centimeters long from a network of branching rhizomes. The leaves are flat, green, and very narrow, less than 2 millimeters wide. The small open inflorescence is made up of 2 to 4 small rounded spikes.
