= Sarah Hurwitz =

American speechwriter, author, and lawyer

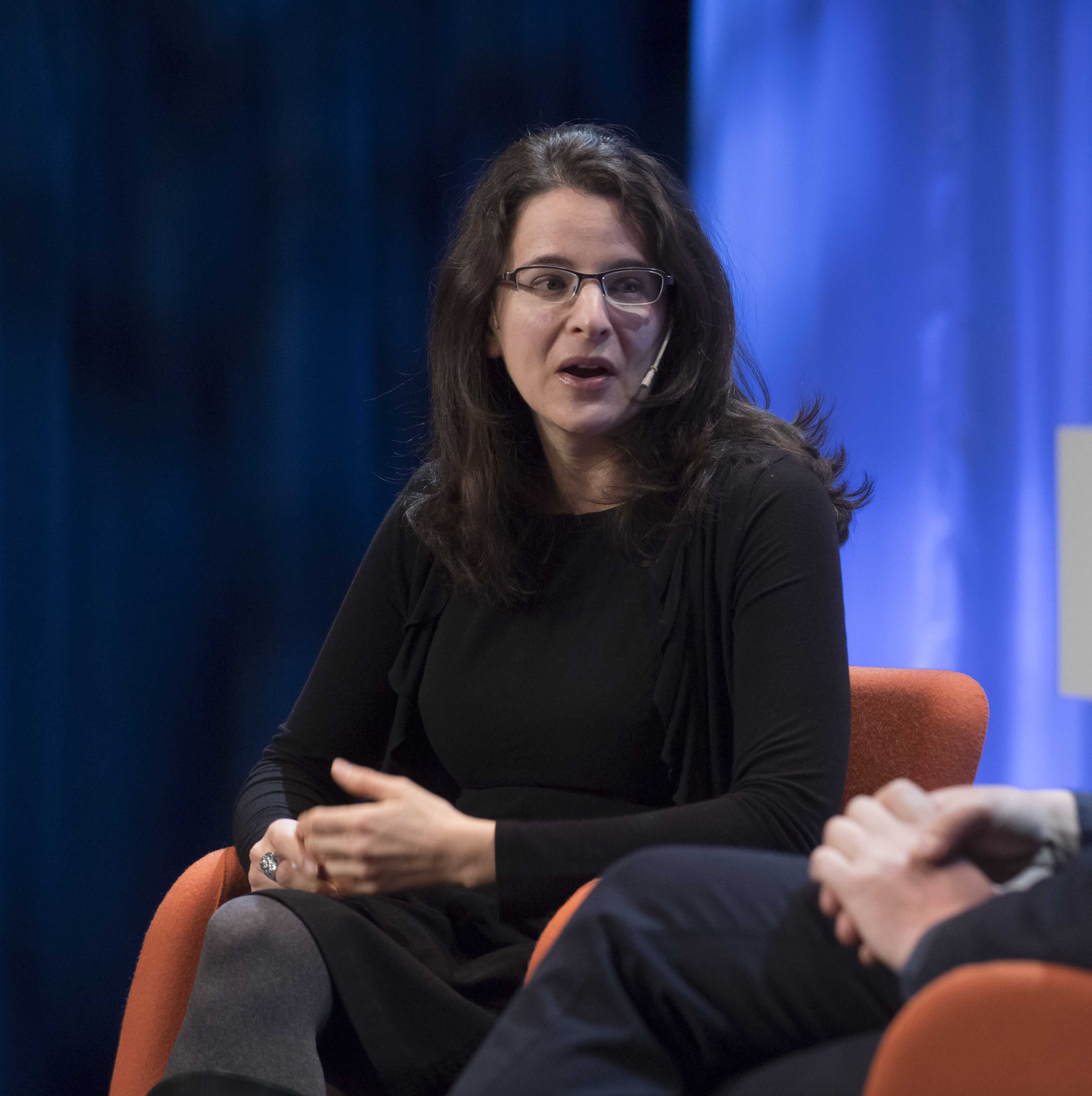
- Born: Wayland, Massachusetts
- Education: Harvard University; Harvard Law School
- Occupations: Author and speechwriter
- Website: sarahhurwitz.net

Sarah Hurwitz is an American author and speechwriter. She served as a White House speechwriter during the Obama administration, first as a senior speechwriter for President Barack Obama and later as chief speechwriter for First Lady Michelle Obama. Hurwitz previously worked as a speechwriter for Democratic political figures and campaigns including Tom Harkin, Wesley Clark, John Kerry, and Hillary Clinton, for whom she was chief speechwriter during her 2008 presidential campaign.

Hurwitz helped write several of Michelle Obama's major addresses, including her speeches at the 2008, 2012, and 2016 Democratic National Conventions, and she also worked in support of two of Obama's East Wing initiatives, Let's Move! and Joining Forces. After leaving the White House, she became a fellow at the Harvard Institute of Politics and wrote books focusing on Judaism, Jewish identity, and antisemitism.

== Early life and education ==
Hurwitz is from Wayland, Massachusetts. Hurwitz grew up in a culturally Jewish home and attended Hebrew school as a child. She became interested in politics after visiting Washington, D.C. on an eighth grade school trip. She subsequently attended Harvard University and Harvard Law School.

== Career ==
=== Campaign speechwriting ===
Hurwitz began her career in political speechwriting as an intern in Vice President Al Gore's speechwriting office in 1998. She later worked as a speechwriter for Senator Tom Harkin of Iowa and as deputy chief speechwriter for General Wesley Clark's campaign in 2003 and Senator John Kerry's campaign in 2004. During the 2008 Democratic presidential primaries, Hurwitz served as chief speechwriter for Hillary Clinton, and she helped write Clinton's 2008 concession speech.

Barack Obama's campaign reached out to Hurwitz two days after Clinton's concession to offer her a job on the campaign. Hurwitz joined Barack Obama's 2008 general-election campaign as a senior speechwriter where her first assignment was to help write Michelle Obama's address at the 2008 Democratic National Convention.

=== Obama administration ===
From 2009 to 2017, Hurwitz served as a White House speechwriter, first as a senior speechwriter for President Obama and later as chief speechwriter for First Lady Michelle Obama. Hurwitz helped write many of Michelle Obama's major addresses, including her speeches at the 2012 and 2016 Democratic National Conventions. Michelle Obama's 2016 speech received widespread positive attention, and The Buffalo News reported that searches for her speechwriter became the top trending Google search after the address. The Washington Post reported in 2016 that Hurwitz had at the time written for the Obamas for eight years and for Michelle Obama almost exclusively for nearly seven. She also worked in support of two of Michelle Obama's East Wing initiatives, Let's Move! and Joining Forces.

In addition to her speechwriting work, Hurwitz served as a senior advisor to the White House Council on Women and Girls, working on policy issues affecting them. The Forward included Hurwitz in their Forward 50 list as one of 2016's fifty most influential Jewish Americans, based on her work for the Obama White House.

=== Writing on Judaism and antisemitism ===
After leaving the White House, Hurwitz was appointed by President Obama to the United States Holocaust Memorial Council in January 2017 before he left office and she served as a fellow at the Institute of Politics at Harvard Kennedy School in 2017. She later turned to writing and speaking about Judaism, Jewish identity, and antisemitism. In a 2023 NPR interview, Hurwitz said that after going through a breakup in her 30s, she took an introductory Judaism class offered by the D.C. Jewish Community Center and later attended a Jewish meditation retreat, experiences that contributed to her return to Jewish tradition as an adult. During the 2020 pandemic, Hurwitz was a guest speaker for Hillel International's virtual programming to support students during the High Holy Days.

Hurwitz's first book, Here All Along: Finding Meaning, Spirituality, and a Deeper Connection to Life – in Judaism (After Finally Choosing to Look There), was published by Spiegel & Grau on September 3, 2019. The book, part memoir and part introduction to Jewish thought and practice, describes Hurwitz's return to Jewish study and observance as an adult. Kirkus Reviews called it, "A solid guide to Judaism for reluctant believers." It was a finalist for the Sami Rohr Prize for Jewish Literature in 2020.

Her second book, As a Jew: Reclaiming Our Story from Those Who Blame, Shame, and Try to Erase Us, was published by HarperOne in 2025. In coverage of the book, JTA described Hurwitz as a liberal Zionist. The book examines the ways Jewish identity has been shaped by antisemitism and by Jews' efforts to assimilate in the hope of escaping persecution. In the book, Hurwitz contends that Holocaust education is incomplete if it does not address the broader historical scope of antisemitism. As a Jew also includes a chapter that aims to counter the characterization of Zionism as colonialist and racist, while noting that Israel is not without "serious flaws."

As a Jew received favorable reviews from several Jewish and religion-focused publications. Publishers Weekly named it as one of the best religion books of 2025, describing it as both a personal work inspired by Hurwitz's adult return to Jewish faith and an analysis of the pressures shaping modern American Judaism. The Jewish Book Council praised the book and named it the winner of the "Contemporary Jewish Life and Practice" category at the 75th National Jewish Book Awards. Kirkus Reviews described it as "a spirited defense of Jewish identity" that addressed Jewish life in 21st century America. It debuted on The New York Times Best Seller list on September 25, 2025.

=== 2025 remarks on Holocaust education and the Gaza war ===
In November 2025, Hurwitz spoke at the Jewish Federations of North America's General Assembly during a plenary discussion about antisemitism and Jewish identity.

"So you have TikTok just smashing our young people's brains all day long with video of carnage in Gaza. And this is why so many of us can't have a sane conversation with younger Jews because anything that we try to say to them, they are hearing it through this wall of carnage. So I want to give data and information and facts and arguments and they are just seeing in their minds carnage and I sound obscene... Holocaust education is absolutely essential. But I think it may be confusing some of our young people about antisemitism, because they learn about big, strong Nazis hurting weak, emaciated Jews, and they think, 'Oh, antisemitism is like anti-black racism, right? Powerful white people against powerless black people.' So when on TikTok, all day long, they see powerful Israelis hurting weak, skinny Palestinians, it's not surprising that they think, 'Oh, I know the lesson of the Holocaust is you fight Israel. You fight the big, powerful people hurting the weak people."

— Hurwitz

The remarks drew criticism after clips circulated online. Critics, including Jenin Younes of the American-Arab Anti-Discrimination Committee, journalist Spencer Ackerman, and Palestinian American writer Yousef Munayyer, said that Hurwitz had minimized Palestinian suffering, deflected criticism of Israel's actions in the Gaza war, and wrongly framed Holocaust education, social media, or young Jews' perceptions as the problem rather than Israel's conduct. Rabbi Sandra Lawson, a progressive American rabbi, separately criticized Hurwitz's remarks, saying that the moral lessons of the Holocaust should be understood universally rather than only in relation to Jewish suffering. Hurwitz's defenders maintained that excerpts from the panel had circulated without sufficient context and that her broader point concerned the need to teach the history of antisemitism as a longer historical phenomenon rather than only through the Holocaust. In Commentary, Lahav Harkov defended Hurwitz's broader argument, saying that the reaction to her remarks illustrated the concerns about Jewish identity and antisemitism Hurwitz raised in her book As a Jew.
