= Exeter, Pennsylvania =

Borough in Pennsylvania, US

- Borough
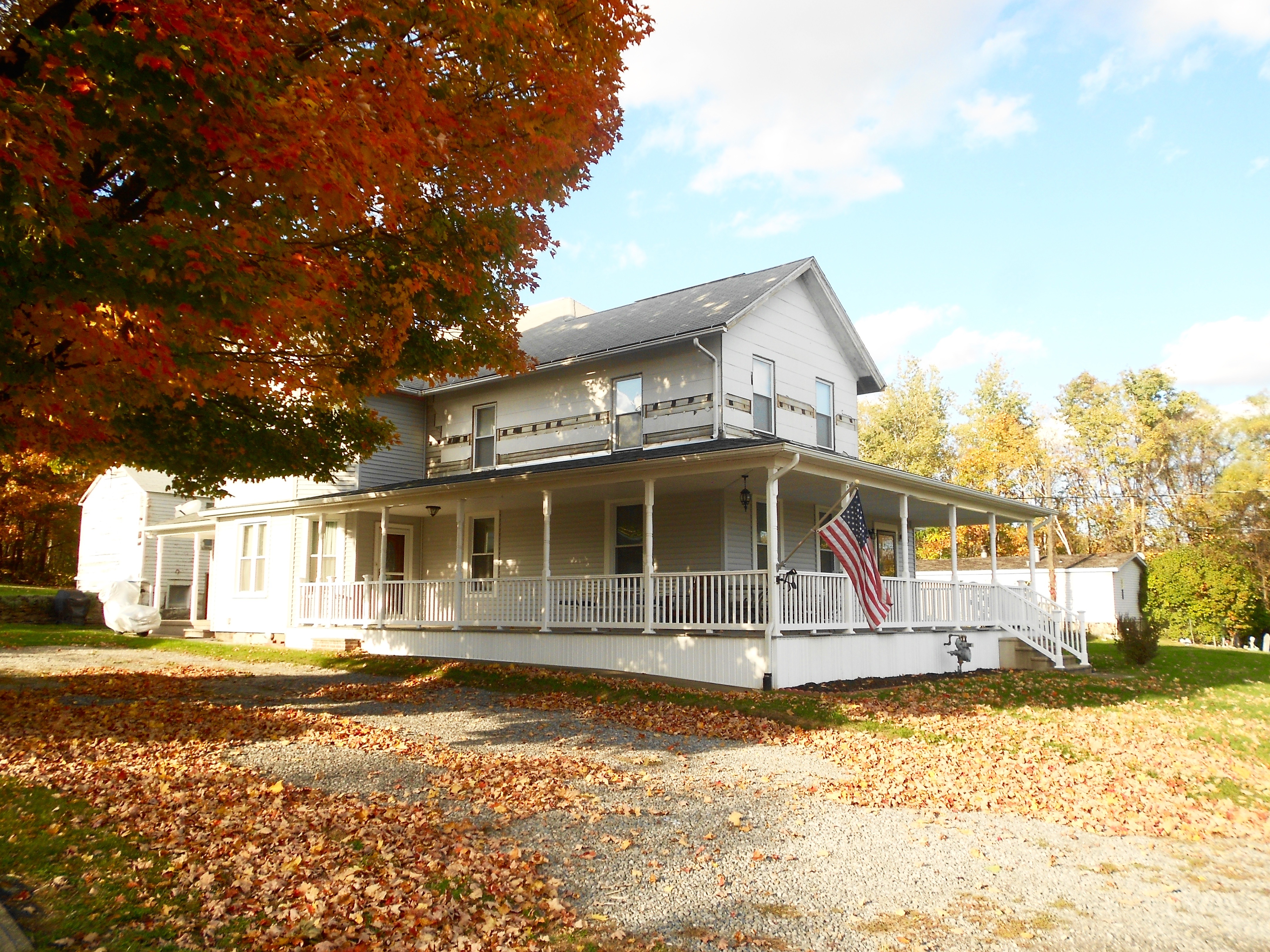
- House on Slocum Avenue

- Location of Exeter in Luzerne County, Pennsylvania.

- Location within Pennsylvania Location within the United States
- Coordinates: 41°19′32″N 75°49′10″W
- Country: United States
- State: Pennsylvania
- County: Luzerne
- Region: Greater Pittston
- Incorporated: 1884

Government
  - Type: Borough Council
  - Mayor: Denise Adams

Area
  - Total: 4.92 sq mi (12.75 km^{2})
  - Land: 4.62 sq mi (11.96 km^{2})
  - Water: 0.31 sq mi (0.80 km^{2})

Population (2020)
  - Total: 5,514
  - Density: 1,194.5/sq mi (461.19/km^{2})
- Time zone: UTC-5 (Eastern (EST))
  - Summer (DST): UTC-4 (EDT)
- ZIP Code: 18643
- Area code: 570
- FIPS code: 42-24392
- Website: https://exeterborough.com/

Exeter is a borough in the Greater Pittston-Wilkes-Barre area of Luzerne County, Pennsylvania, United States. It is about 10 miles (16 km) west of Scranton and a few miles north of Wilkes-Barre. It is located on the western bank of the Susquehanna River and has a total area of 5.0 square miles (12.9 km^{2}). As of the 2020 United States Census, Exeter had a population of 5,513.

== History ==
The name Exeter derives from the ancient city of Exeter in Devon, England. Numerous other places in Canada and the United States have also been given the same name.

In 1769, settlers from Connecticut began making their homes in the Wyoming Valley of Northeastern Pennsylvania but came into conflict with settlers from Pennsylvania during the Pennamite–Yankee Wars.

In early July 1778, during the Revolutionary War, a large-scale raid by Butler's Rangers and their Iroquois allies entered the valley. Fort Wintermoot (in present-day Exeter) and Fort Jenkins (in present-day West Pittston) quickly surrendered and were later burned to the ground. On July 3, 1778, about three hundred Patriot militia and Continentals died at the Battle of Wyoming, also known as the Wyoming Massacre, which took place in present-day Exeter and Wyoming.

Exeter was founded a fertile agricultural area—once the heartland of the Susquehannock people. Much lumbering and coal-mining was carried out in the area in the 19th and 20th centuries. In the 1830s, the region entered a boom period and began shipping coal by the Pennsylvania Canal, and by the 1840s down the Lehigh Canal to Allentown, Philadelphia, Trenton, Wilmington, New York City, and other East Coast cities and ports. This was done by the connecting engineering works of the Lehigh Coal & Navigation Company. These works included the upper Lehigh Canal, the Ashley Planes, the early Lehigh and Susquehanna Railroad (L&S), and other railroads in the area.

After severe flooding ripped up the upper Lehigh Canal in the 1860s, the L&S was extended to the Delaware along the lower canal, keeping the markets of the big cities connected to the still growing Wyoming Valley collieries and breakers. A second rail line was pushed up the Lehigh Gorge (the Lehigh Valley Railroad), enabling the resurgence of coal exportation to the East Coast cities; it also connected the region to the Erie Railroad and Buffalo, New York.

Exeter was incorporated as a borough in 1884. By 1900, the population consisted of 1,948 citizens. The town lost usable lands in the 1959 Knox Mine Disaster, when the river broke through and flooded the local mines. This essentially shut down the coal mining industry in and around Exeter. Subsequently, despite the local loss of industry, the fact that the population was 5,652 at the 2010 census indicates that the former farmlands have been attractive to building developers.

== Geography ==
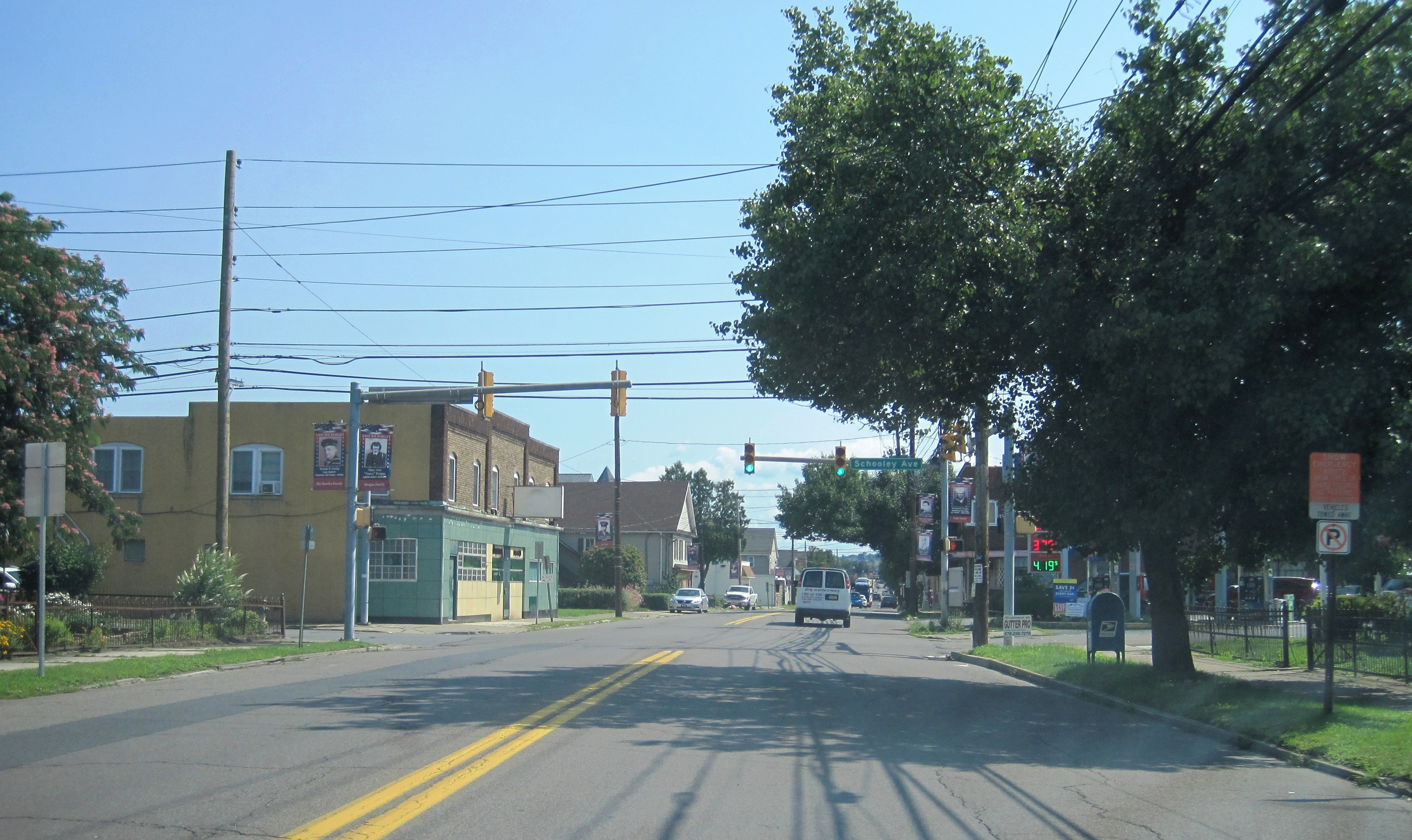
Route 11 in Exeter

Exeter is located along the western bank of the Susquehanna River. U.S. Route 11 runs through the southern section of the town, connecting the boroughs of West Pittston and Wyoming. The majority of its streets are arrayed around this highway. PA 92 runs through the eastern portion of the borough, connecting West Pittston and Exeter Township. Fox Hill Country Club is located in central Exeter. The borough surrounds West Pittston from the north, south, and west. Scovell Island and Wintermoot Island are located within Exeter's borders (on the Susquehanna River). Most of the northern borough consists of hills and forests.

According to the United States Census Bureau, the borough has a total area of 5.0 square miles (12.9 km^{2}), of which 4.7 square miles (12.1 km^{2}) is land and 0.31 square miles (0.8 km^{2}), or 6.52%, is water. Its ZIP code is 18643. Exeter Borough lies within the Wyoming Area School District. Wyoming Area Catholic School is a parochial school within the borough.

== Government ==
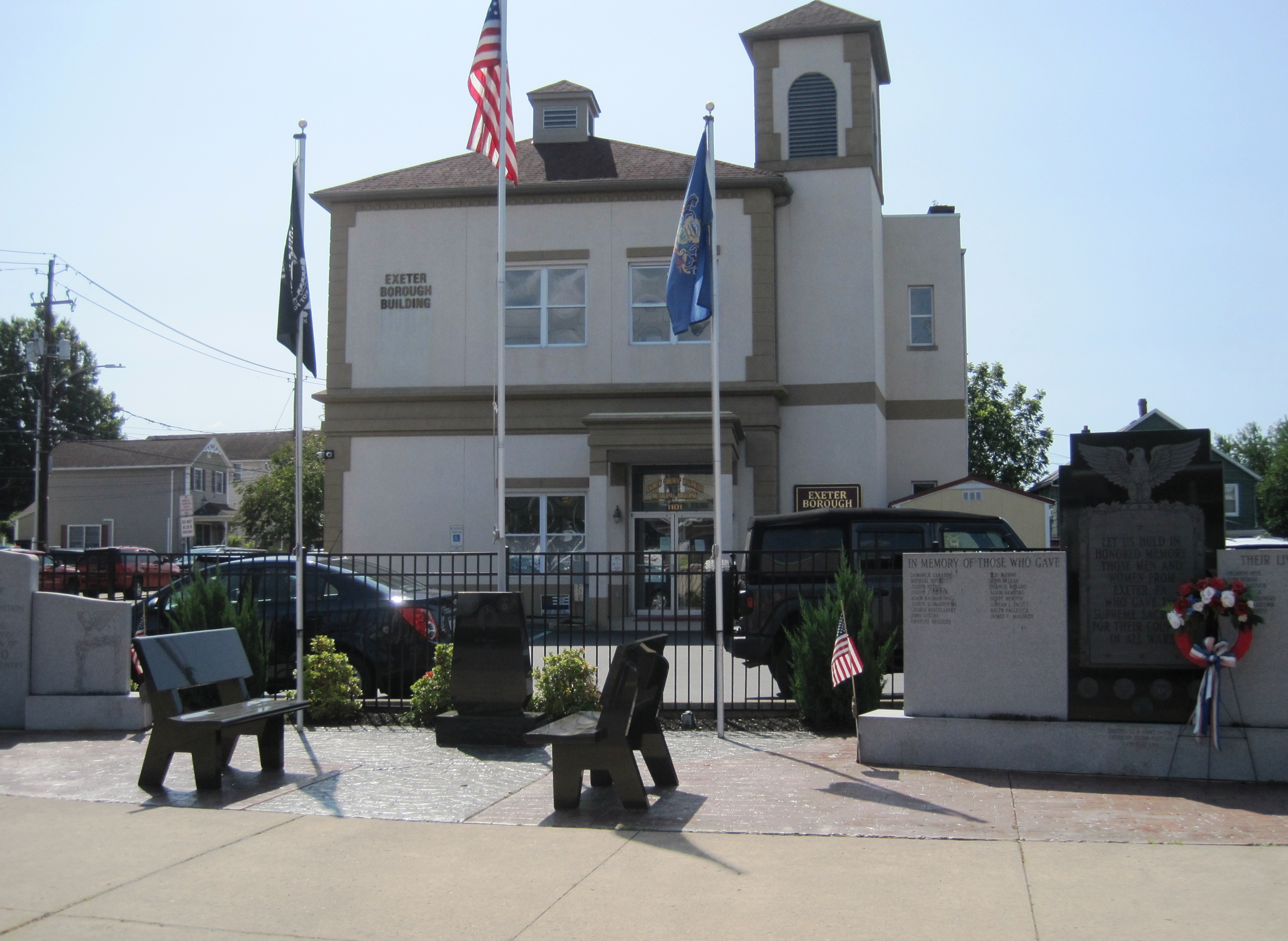
Exeter Borough Hall

Cassandra Coleman was appointed to the office of mayor in 2008. She was a 21-year-old political science student at King's College in Wilkes-Barre. She was recommended for the position by her grandfather, Mayor Joseph F. Coyne III, before his death. On Monday, January 19, 2015, Cassandra Coleman resigned as mayor to take the position of Northeast Regional Director for Governor Tom Wolf. Herman Castallani took over as mayor after Coleman's resignation. Denise Adams won the mayoral election in November 2017; she was sworn in as mayor on January 2, 2018.

== Demographics ==
Historical population
Census	Pop.	Note	%±
1890	790		—
1900	1,948		146.6%
1910	3,537		81.6%
1920	4,176		18.1%
1930	5,724		37.1%
1940	5,802		1.4%
1950	5,130		−11.6%
1960	4,747		−7.5%
1970	4,670		−1.6%
1980	5,493		17.6%
1990	5,691		3.6%
2000	5,955		4.6%
2010	5,652		−5.1%
2020	5,514		−2.4%
2021 (est.)	5,510	▼	−0.1%

As of the census of 2000, there were 5,955 people, 2,482 households, and 1,640 families residing in the borough. The population density was 1,278.4 inhabitants per square mile (493.6/km^{2}). There were 2,641 housing units at an average density of 567.0 per square mile (218.9/km^{2}). The racial makeup of the borough was 98.69% White, 0.49% African American, 0.13% Native American, 0.13% Asian, 0.03% from other races, and 0.52% from two or more races. Hispanic or Latino of any race were 0.57% of the population.

There were 2,482 households, out of which 26.0% had children under the age of 18 living with them, 48.8% were married couples living together, 13.1% had a female householder with no husband present, and 33.9% were non-families. 30.1% of all households were made up of individuals, and 14.7% had someone living alone who was 65 years of age or older. The average household size was 2.35 and the average family size was 2.92.

In the borough the population was spread out, with 21.0% under the age of 18, 6.9% from 18 to 24, 27.9% from 25 to 44, 23.4% from 45 to 64, and 20.9% who were 65 years of age or older. The median age was 41 years. For every 100 females, there were 84.0 males. For every 100 females age 18 and over, there were 80.3 males.

The median income for a household in the borough was $31,681, and the median income for a family was $40,050. Males had a median income of $31,569 versus $21,693 for females. The per capita income for the borough was $16,022. About 7.6% of families and 8.5% of the population were below the poverty line, including 11.1% of those under age 18 and 5.8% of those age 65 or over.

== Education ==
It is in the Wyoming Area School District.

== Notable people ==
- Joe Amato, five-time NHRA Top Fuel champion
- Anthony Petrosky, poet
- Ann A. Bernatitus, United States Navy nurse during World War II. First American recipient of the Legion of Merit.
