= Historic places in Framingham, Massachusetts =

Coordinates: 42.299795°N 71.426627°W

This is a list of historic sites in Framingham, Massachusetts. There are several notable historic sites in Framingham, according to the Framingham Historical Society. This local society asserts:

While there are many historic spaces in Framingham, the Centre Common is the focal point for the town's past. Three of the town's most historic buildings on the Centre Common face "demolition by neglect." The Village Hall, the Edgell Memorial Library, and the Old Academy building not only house over 10,000 artifacts spanning four centuries of the town's history, but they are symbols of Framingham's commitment to educational excellence, civic engagement, and community pride.

One historic site is Shopper's World which opened on October 4, 1951 (as Shoppers' World), making it one of the earliest suburban shopping malls in the country.

== History of Framingham ==
Framingham, sited on the ancient trail known as the Old Connecticut Path, was first settled when John Stone settled on the west bank of the Sudbury River in 1647. In 1660, Judge Thomas Danforth, of the Salem Witch Trials fame, an official of the Bay Colony, formerly of Framlingham, Suffolk, received a grant of land at "Danforth's Farms" and began to accumulate over 15,000 acres (61 km^{2}). He strenuously resisted petitions for incorporation of the town, which was officially incorporated in 1700, following his death the previous year. Why the "L" was dropped for the new town's name is not known. The first church was organized in 1701, the first teacher was hired in 1706, and the first permanent schoolhouse was built in 1716.

On February 22, 1775, the British general Thomas Gage sent two officers and an enlisted man out of Boston to survey the route to Worcester. In Framingham those spies stopped at Buckminster's Tavern. They watched the town militia muster outside the building, impressed with the men's numbers but not their discipline. Though "the whole company" came into the tavern after their drill, the officers managed to remain undetected and continued on their mission the next day. Gage did not order a march along that route, instead ordering troops to Concord on April 18–19. Framingham sent two militia companies totaling about 130 men into the Battles of Lexington and Concord that followed; one of those men was wounded.

== National Register-listed sites ==
Framingham has several properties listed in the U.S. National Register of Historic Places These meet standards of significance at a national level, for architecture, association with historic events or people, and so on.

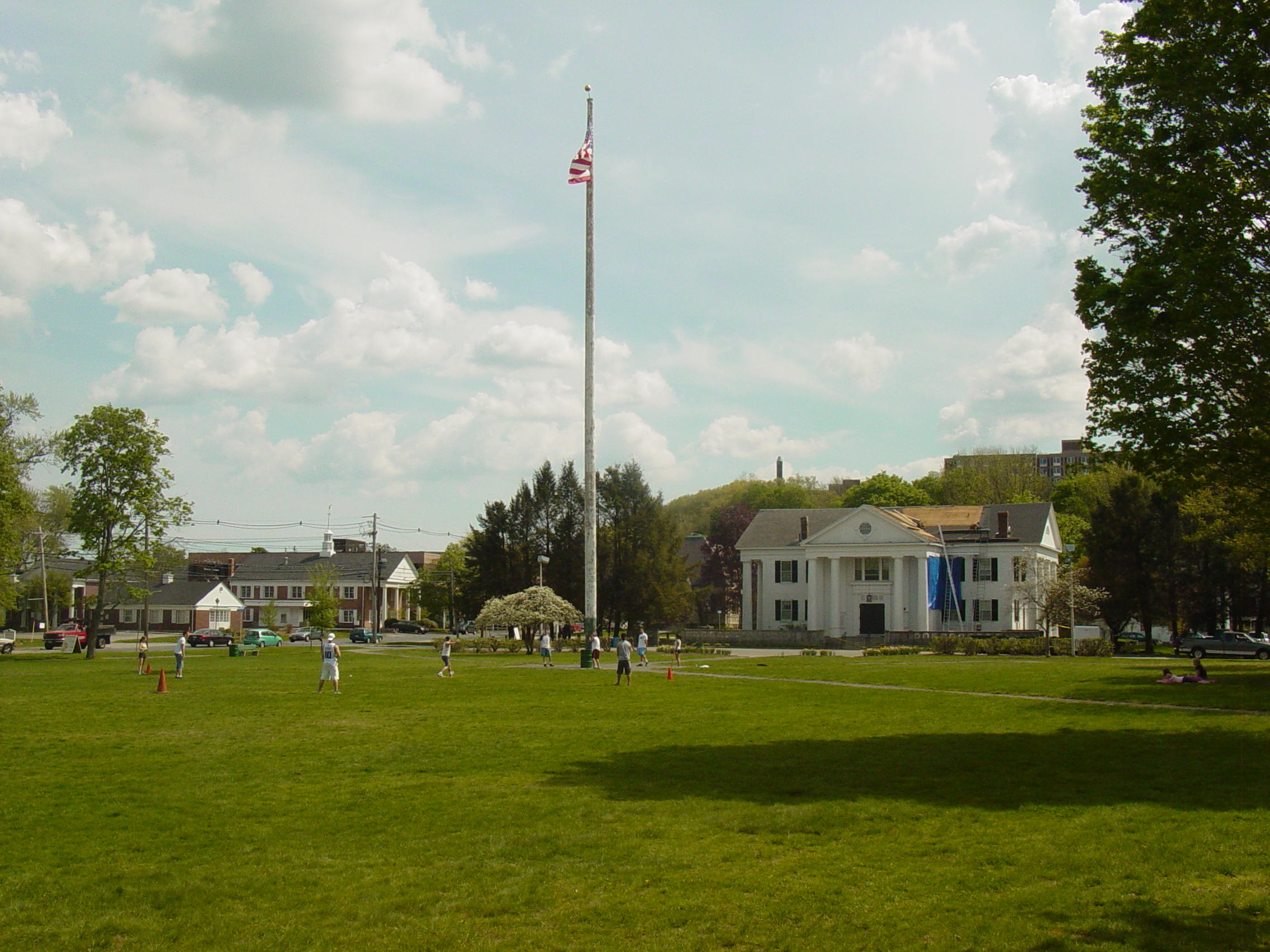
Framingham Common

- Concord Square Historic District — Park, Concord, and Kendall Sts., and Union Ave.
- First Baptist Church — 1013 Worcester Rd.
- Framingham Centre Common Historic District — Roughly centered on Framingham Center Common, between MA 9 and I-90
- Framingham Railroad Station — 417 Waverly St.
- Framingham Reservoir No. 1 Dam and Gatehouse — E end of Framingham Reservoir No. 1, off Winter St. N of Long Ave.
- Framingham Reservoir No. 2 Dam and Gatehouse — Between Framingham Reservoirs Nos. 1 and 2, W of jct. of Winter and Fountain Sts.
- Framingham Reservoir No. 3 Dam and Gatehouse — SE end of Framingham Reservoir No. 3, off MA 9/30
- Irving Square Historic District — Irving Square, Waverly, South, Columbia, Irving, Gordon and Hollis Sts.
- Lake Cochituate Dam — NW side of Lake Cochituate
- Moses Ellis House — 283 Pleasant St.
- Paul Gibbs House — 1147 Edmands Rd.
- Saint John's Episcopal Church — Maynard Rd. and Church St.
- Saxonville Historic District — Roughly, along Elm, Danforth, Central, Water and Concord Sts.
- Sudbury Aqueduct Linear District — Along Sudbury Aqueduct from Farm Pond at Waverly St. to Chestnut Hill Reservoir (extends into other towns as well)
- Whit's Diner — 184A Fountain St. (listed in 2003)

== Other historical places ==
- Framingham Civic League — Located downtown, part of the Cultural Triangle with the library, Nevins Hall, the Danforth Museum, and the Performing Arts Center of Metrowest. Historic theatre hosts performances, bingo, ESL classes, etc.
- Framingham State University — The first women's public college in the United States and alma mater of Christa McAuliffe, founded 1839.
- Old Connecticut Path — Native American trail that led westward from the area of Massachusetts Bay to the Connecticut River Valley, the very first of the North American trails that led west from the settlements close to the Atlantic seacoast, towards the interior. The earliest colonists of Massachusetts Bay Colony used it, and rendered it wider by driving cattle along it.
- The Henry Knox Trail — The path that General Henry Knox used in the winter of 1775 - 1776 to deliver to General George Washington a train of artillery brought from Fort Ticonderoga in order to be used to force the British army to evacuate Boston.

== See also ==
- National Register of Historic Places listings in Middlesex County, Massachusetts
