= Clara Augusta Jones Trask =

American writer

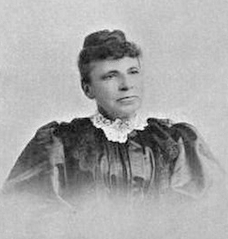
- Born: Clara Augusta Jones; June 22, 1839; Farmington, New Hampshire, US
- Died: January 2, 1905 (aged 65)
- Spouse: Elbridge S. Trask
- Writing career
- Pen name: Clara Augusta; Hero Strong

Clara Augusta Jones Trask (née, Jones; pen names, Clara Augusta and Hero Strong; June 22, 1839 – January 2, 1905) was a popular 19th-century American writer from New Hampshire, with several hundred titles to her credit. A dime novelist, she wrote in a variety of genres and styles. In the 1895 edition of The Granite Monthly it was said that, "It is doubtful if any woman contributor to current periodicals has received larger returns for her work than has Mrs. Clara Augusta Trask, with the exception of those who own royalties on plays."

== Biography ==
Clara Augusta Jones was born June 22, 1839, in Farmington, New Hampshire, within a half mile of the childhood home of Vice-President Henry Wilson, and was the daughter of Jeremiah Jones, and the former Tamson Roberts. Her grandmother on her father's side was the accomplished daughter of Col. Ichabod Crane, an officer in the British army, and a lineal descendant of Henry Howard, Earl of Surrey. Her maternal grandfather served in the Revolutionary War.

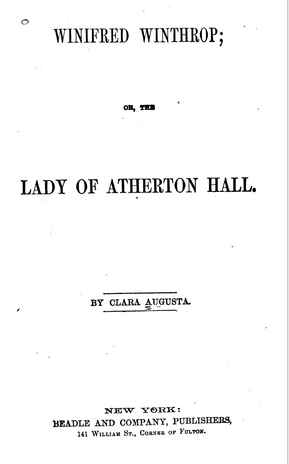
Winifred Winthrop, Or, The Lady of Atherton Hall

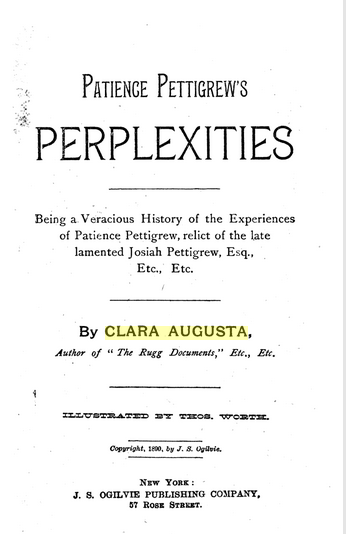
Patience Pettigrew's Perplexities

Trask's first published article appeared when she was 13 years of age, and thereafter she wrote continuously, for newspapers, magazines, and periodicals. Perhaps her best known articles were the "Kate Thorn" papers and essays, which were copied widely, as well as translated into several languages for use in foreign periodicals. The Lippincotts of Philadelphia published a volume of her poems, and she was the author of several humorous books, the most noted of which was The Adventures of a Bashful Bachelor.

Her poems, sketches, and serials appeared in Arthur's Home Magazine, Ballou's Literary Companion, Monthly, and Pictorial, Banner Weekly, Dollar Newspaper (Philadelphia), Gleason's, Golden Days, Graham's Illustrated Magazine, The Granite Monthly, The Hearthstone, Lady's Friend, Leslie's Monthly, The New York Weekly, Our Boys and Girls, Peterson's Magazine, Saturday Journal, and Saturday Night. In the 1870s, she had a column in the New York Weekly. She wrote using the pen names Clara Augusta and Hero Strong.

She married Elbridge S. Trask, and resided in Framingham Centre, Massachusetts, in one of the old historic mansions of that town. She was a member of the New England Woman's Press Association, of the Daughters of New Hampshire, of the Gen. J. G. Foster W. R. C., of the Framingham Woman's Club, and was a well-known worker in the Order of Patrons of Husbandry.

Clara Trask died January 2, 1905.

== Selected works ==
=== As Clara Augusta Jones Trask, Clara Augusta Jones, or Clara Augusta ===
- Fatal Glove
- Winifred Winthrop, or, The lady of Atherton Hall, 1882
- The Parson's Secret Sin, "The Plaindealer: Selected Short Stories", 1890–1893
- Patience Pettigrew's perplexities. Being a veracious history of the experiences of Patience Pettigrew, relict of the late lamented Josiah Pettigrew, esq. ..., 1890
- The adventures of a bashful bachelor : a humorous story, 1890

=== As Hero Strong ===
- Born to command, or, The mistress of Hillmere, 1893
- Found dead, or, The Charles River mystery, 1892
- A beautiful womans sin; or, The scarred arm, 1890
- Yates' Ranch (Savannah Tribune: Selected Short Stories, 1906-1909)
