= St Tarcisius Church =

St Tarcisius Church may refer to:

== United Kingdom ==
- St Tarcisius Church, Camberley, Surrey

== United States ==
- St Tarcisius Church, Framingham, see Places of worship in Framingham, Massachusetts

== See also ==
- Saint Tarcisius
