= Alexander Rice Esty =

American architect (1826–1881)

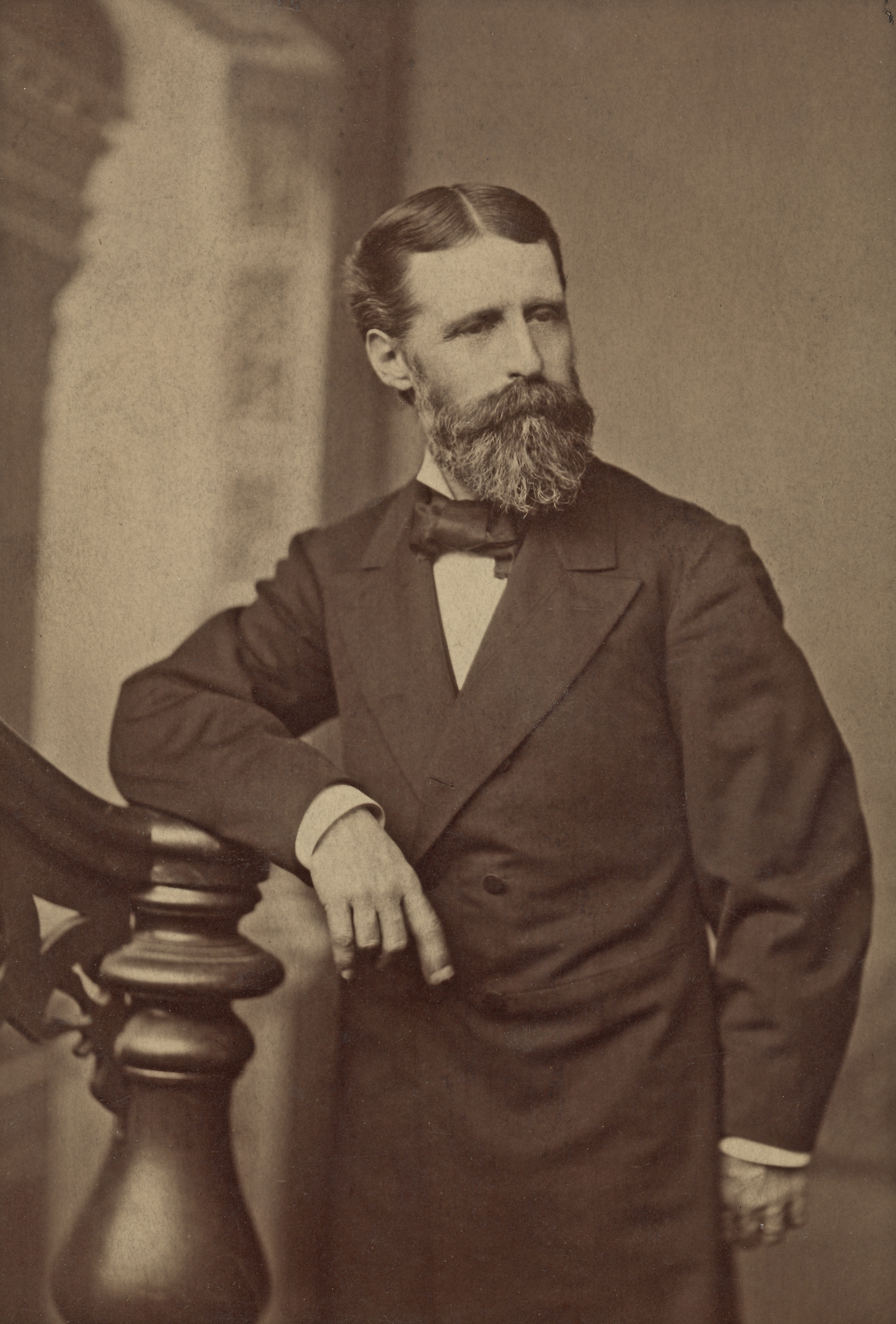
- Born: October 18, 1826; Framingham, Massachusetts, U.S.
- Died: July 2, 1881 (aged 54); Framingham, Massachusetts, U.S.
- Burial place: Edgell Grove Cemetery (Framingham)
- Education: Framingham Academy
- Occupation: Architect
- Spouses: Julia Maria Wight (m. 1854; died 1862); Charlotte Louise Blake (m. 1865; died 1866); Emma Corning Newell (m. 1867)
- Children: 6
- Relatives: Constantine C. Esty (brother)

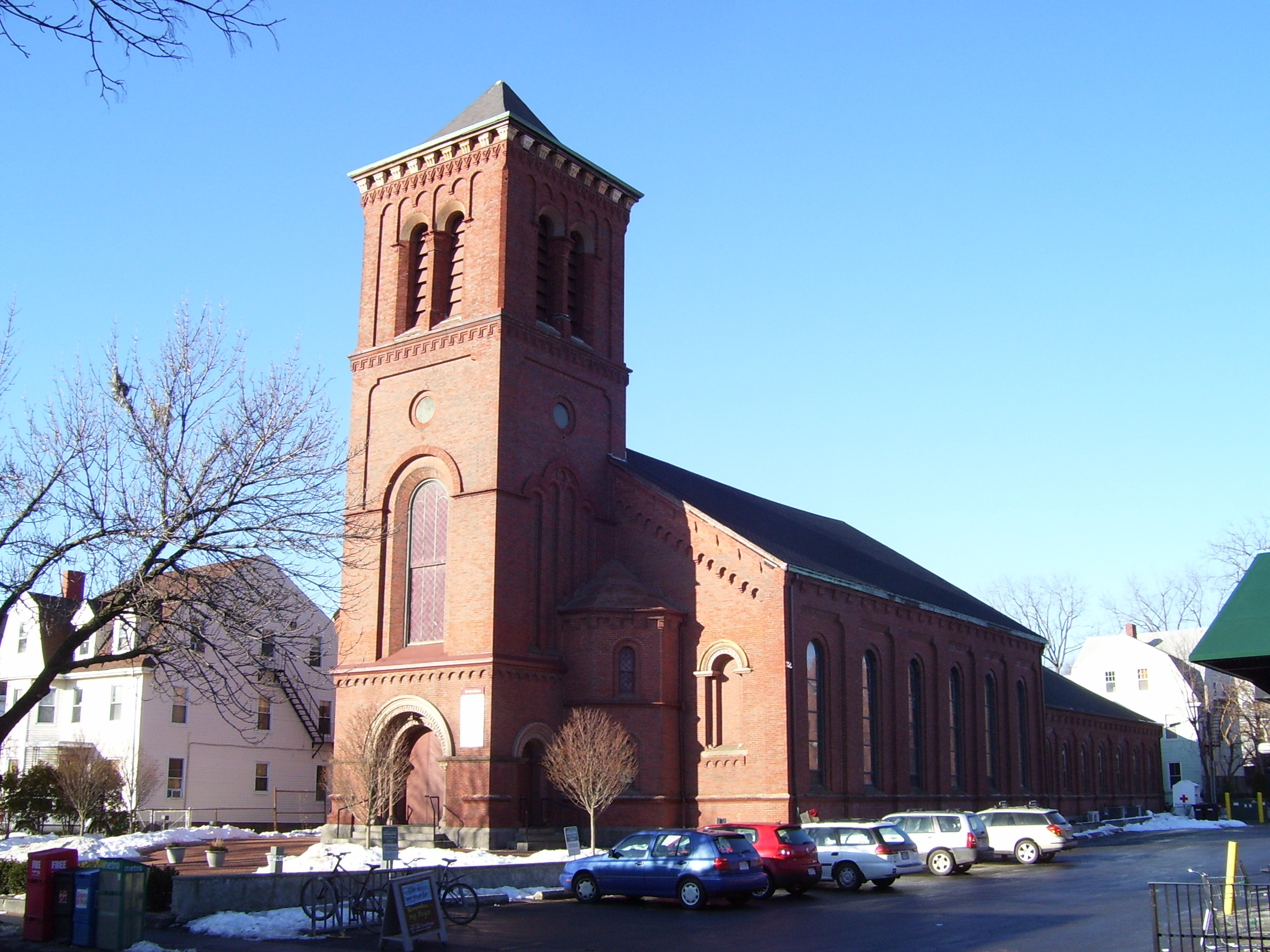
Prospect Congregational Church (now Christ the King), built in 1851, is one of Esty's earliest church buildings and features the earlier symmetrical style with a center tower.

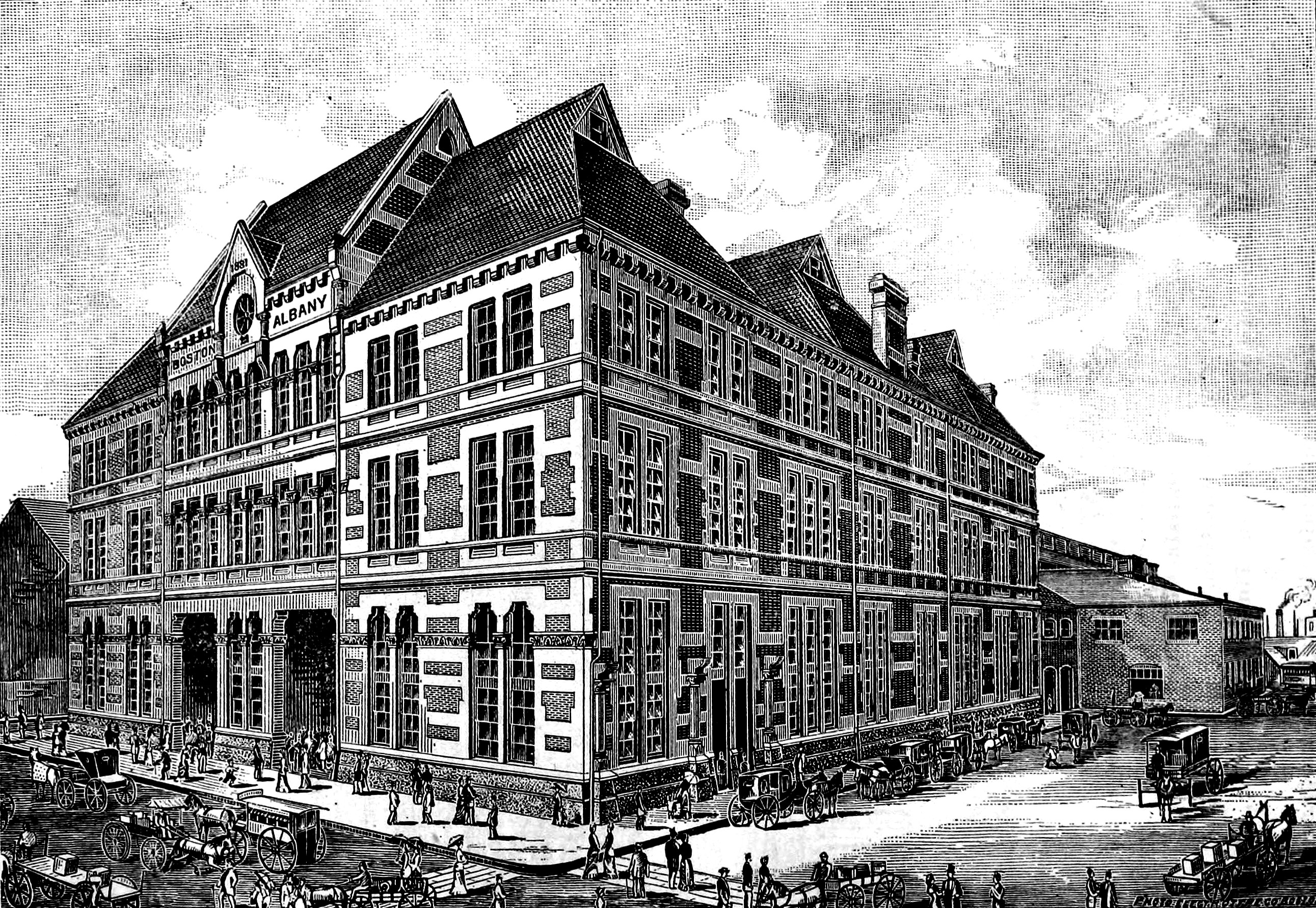
Boston & Albany Railroad station, Boston, MA (took up the block bounded by Kneeland, Lincoln and Utica Streets), completed in 1881, is one of Esty's last buildings

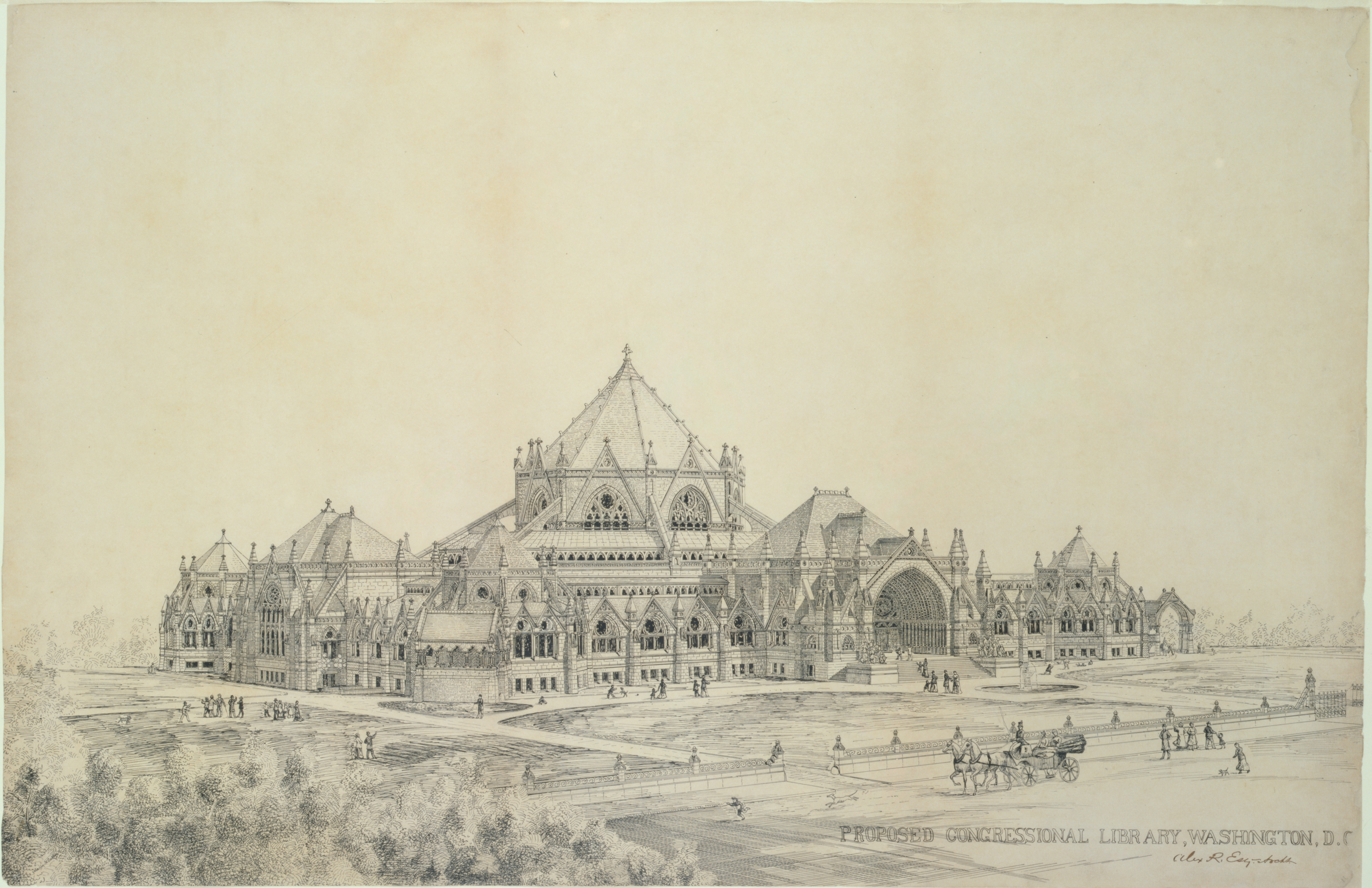
Proposed Library of Congress "Congressional Library", Washington D.C., 1873 rendering by A.R.Esty

Alexander Rice Esty (also known as Alexander Rice Estey) (18 October 1826 – 2 July 1881) was an American architect known for designing many Gothic Revival churches in New England. His work also encompassed university buildings, public buildings, office buildings, and private residences across the Northeastern United States.

== Biography ==
Esty was born in Framingham, Massachusetts, the youngest child of Dexter Esty (1791–1860), a local builder, and Mary Eames Esty (née Rice, 1787–1849). He was the brother of U.S. Representative Constantine C. Esty. Esty was a descendant of Edmund Rice, an early immigrant to Massachusetts Bay Colony, and a direct descendant of Mary Towne Esty, who was executed during the Salem Witch Trials.

Esty attended Framingham Academy as a boy. He then trained in architecture with Boston architect Richard Bond. He remained a resident of Framingham for his entire life.

Esty married three times:

- in 1854, Julia Maria Wight (1835–1862) daughter of Julia Maria Terry and Lothrop Wight (a wealthy Boston merchant)
- in 1865, Charlotte Louise Blake (1840–1866)
- in 1867, Emma Corning Newell (1845–1886) daughter of Olive Plimpton and George Newell (a sea captain)

In 1847, Esty worked for architect Gridley J. F. Bryant before opening his own Boston office the following year. Many of Esty's churches were variations of a popular nineteenth-century style similar to Richard Upjohn's. In addition to his church designs, Esty designed numerous university, public, and office buildings. He also proposed a design for the Library of Congress building in Washington, D.C.

Esty received an honorary Master of Arts degree in 1866 from the University of Rochester.

From 1876 until his death, Esty was employed by the United States Treasury as Superintendent of Construction to the first United States Post Office and Sub-Treasury Building in Boston's Post Office Square.

Esty died in 1881, aged 54.

== Works listed in the National Register of Historic Places ==
=== Massachusetts ===
- Prospect Congregational Church (Christ the King Church), 1851, Cambridge
- Paul Gibbs House, 1860, Framingham
- Moses Ellis House, 1866, Framingham
- Old Cambridge Baptist Church, 1869, Cambridge
- St. John's Episcopal Church, 1871, Framingham
- Concord Square Historic District, Framingham

=== Elsewhere ===
- First Methodist Church of Burlington, 1869, Burlington, Vermont

== Other works ==
=== Massachusetts ===
- State Normal School Building, 1853, Framingham
- Park Street Baptist Church, 1854, Framingham
- Cornerstone Baptist Church, 1854, Framingham †
- Emmanuel Episcopal Church, 1861, Boston
- St. Mark's Church, 1863, Southborough
- St. John's Episcopal Church, 1864, Gloucester
- Colby Hall at Andover Newton Theological School, 1865, Newton
- Church of Our Saviour, 1868, Brookline
- Newton Free Library, 1870, Newton
- Baptist Church, 1870, North Billerica
- Clinton Town Hall, 1872, Clinton
- Union United Methodist Church, 1872, Boston
- Grace Episcopal Church, 1872, Newton
- Monks Building, 1873, South Boston
- Edgell Grove Cemetery gateway, 1875, Framingham
- Boston and Albany Railroad Station, 1881, Boston

† Cornerstone Baptist Church was remodeled in 1885 by Van Brunt & Howe, to whom the National Register of Historic Places incorrectly gives sole credit.

=== Elsewhere ===
- Anderson Hall at the University of Rochester, 1861, Rochester, New York
- Memorial Hall at Colby College, 1869, Waterville, Maine
- St. Luke's Episcopal Church, 1876, East Greenwich, Rhode Island
- Shurtleff College building, date unknown, Alton, Illinois
