= Christ the King Presbyterian Church =

Historic church in Massachusetts, United States

- Christ the King Presbyterian Church
- Location: Cambridge, Massachusetts
- Country: United States
- Denomination: Presbyterian Church in America
- Website: ctkcambridge.org
- Prospect Congregational Church
- U.S. National Register of Historic Places
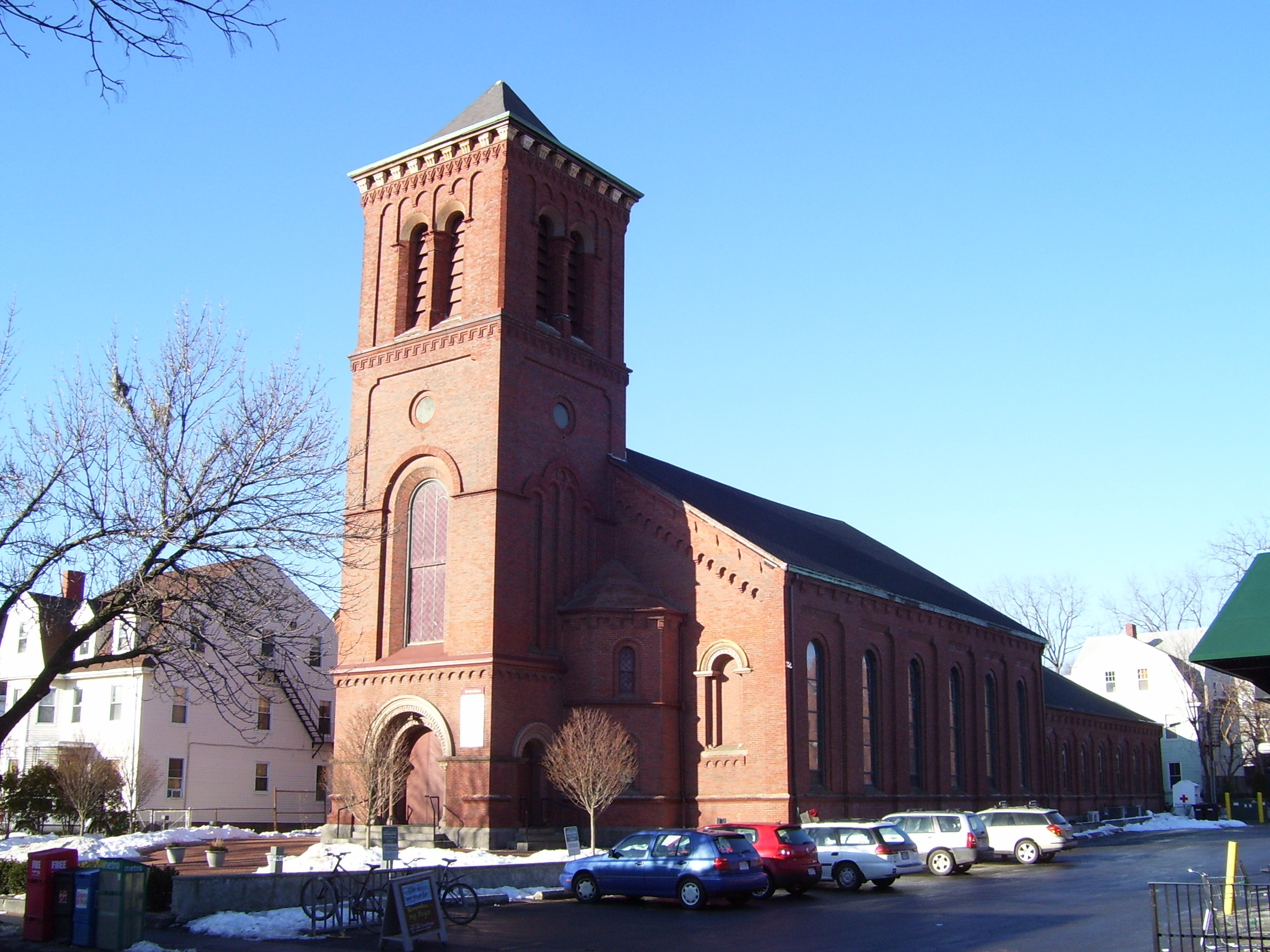

- Location within Massachusetts Location within the United States
- Location: Cambridge, Massachusetts
- Coordinates: 42°22′4.2″N 71°6′9.6″W
- Built: 1851
- Architect: Alexander Rice Esty
- MPS: Cambridge MRA
- NRHP reference No.: 82001970
- Added to NRHP: April 13, 1982

Christ The King Presbyterian Church is a Presbyterian Church in America (PCA) church, founded in 1995. It occupies the historic building of the former Prospect Congregational Church, located at 99 Prospect Street in Cambridge, Massachusetts near Central Square.

== History ==
The historic church building was designed by Alexander Rice Esty and was constructed in 1851 for the First Evangelical Congregational Church in Cambridgeport (Prospect Congregational), a Reformed congregation gathered in 1827 by members of Lyman Beecher's Hanover Street Church in Boston. Beecher and William Augustus Stearns gave the dedicatory sermons in 1852. The church building was listed on the National Register of Historic Places in 1982. In 1985 the original congregation merged with another UCC congregation (North Avenue Congregational Church) to become North Prospect Union Church in Medford and the building stood vacant. In 1995 Christ the King Presbyterian Church (CTK), a Reformed congregation founded the previous year as a church plant, purchased the dormant church building.

== Today ==
The congregation worships at 10:30 on Sunday mornings, offers youth and adult Sunday school classes, and has specialized ministries for men, women, music, community groups, and international missions. Christ the King was historically part of a network of city churches connected to Redeemer Presbyterian Church of New York, and was home to a Church Planting Center working to establish additional churches in New England. Church plants included congregations in Dorchester (2008), Newton (2010), Hanover (2011), Roslindale, Jamaica Plain/Roxbury and Somerville. The Newton congregation meets at St. Mary's Episcopal Church on Sunday evenings.

== Gallery ==
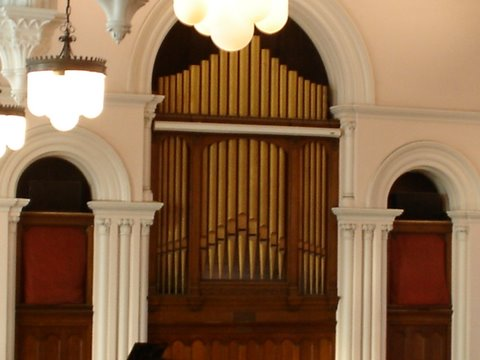
pipe organ

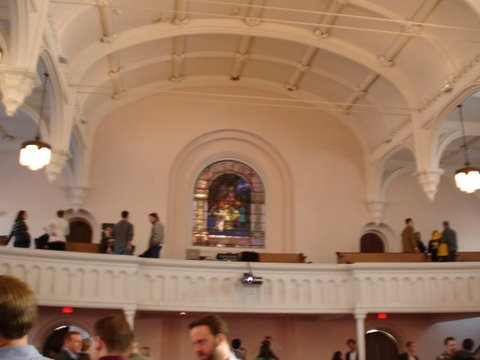
church interior

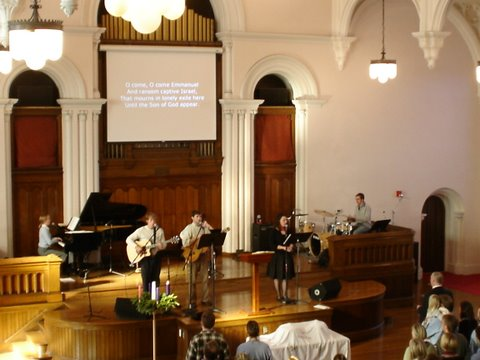
church interior

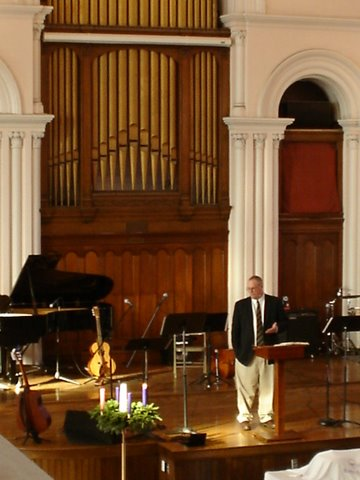
church interior

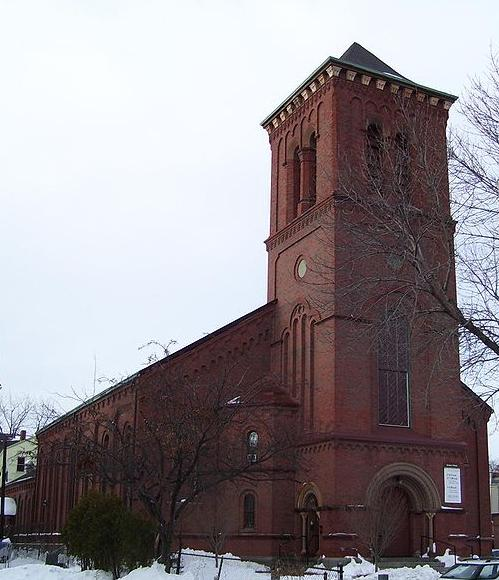
church exterior

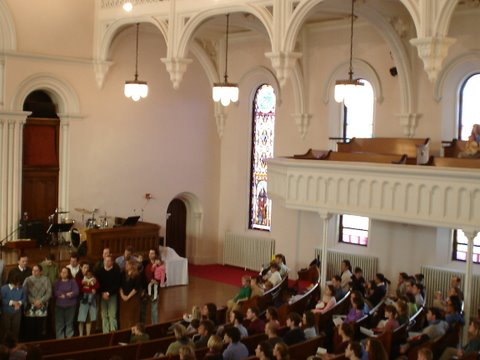
church interior

== See also ==
- National Register of Historic Places listings in Cambridge, Massachusetts
