= Stone's Bridge =

- U.S. National Register of Historic Places
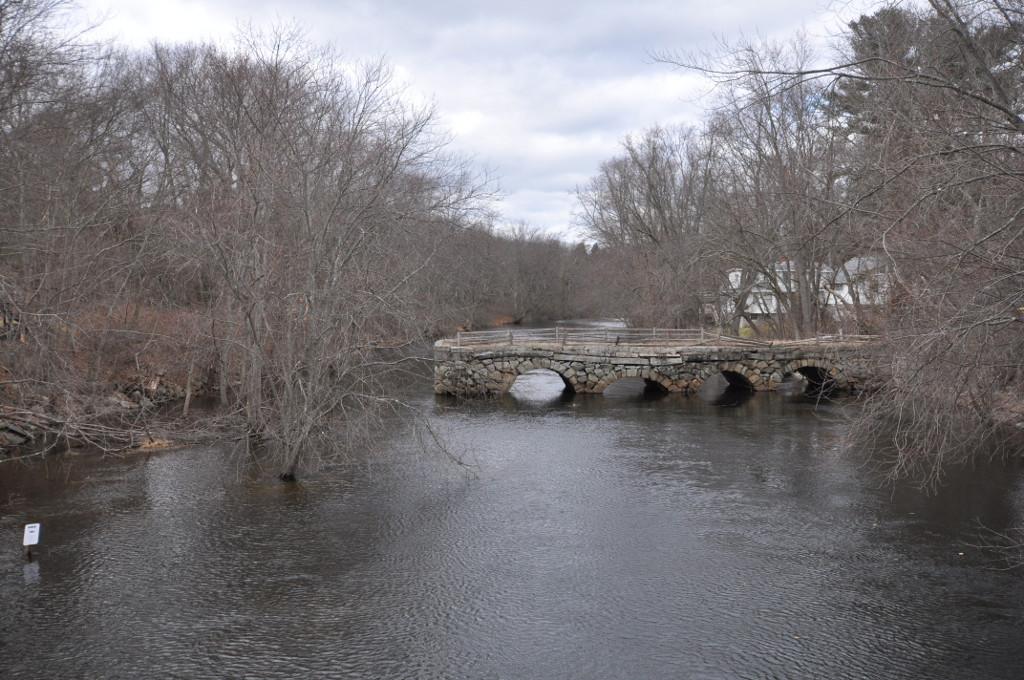
- View of bridge from Stonebridge Road.

- Location within Massachusetts Location within the United States
- Location: Sudbury River off Old Stonebridge Rd., Framingham and Wayland, Massachusetts
- Coordinates: 42°20′21″N 71°23′42″W
- Built: 1858
- Built by: Simonds, William
- Architectural style: Stone arch bridge
- NRHP reference No.: 100000527
- Added to NRHP: January 17, 2017

Stone's Bridge is a historic stone arch bridge in Framingham and Wayland, Massachusetts. It is located just north of Stonebridge Road, and partially crosses the Sudbury River. Built in 1858, it is a well-preserved example of mid-19th century stone bridge construction, despite its truncation in 1955 due to a shift in the river channel. The bridge was listed on the National Register of Historic Places in 1975. It is closed to all access.

== Description and history ==
Stone's Bridge (named for a historic local resident, not for its construction material) is a four-arch stone bridge located on the Sudbury River, the border between Framingam (to the west) and Wayland (to the east). The bridge footings and arches are built out of dry laid split granite stone, topped with a grassy surface. The bridge ends on the west side of the current main channel of the river, but before reaching the Framingham shore. That end is terminated by a stone-faced concrete pier built against the former western abutment.

This location has had a crossing of some sort since early colonial days. A bridge is mentioned at this location in 1674, as a "horse bridge" near the home of Daniel Stone. It is believed that this bridge was crossed by the guns of Ticonderoga during the American Revolutionary War; a marker has been placed on the Wayland end, indicating it is part of the Henry Knox Trail, commemorating this action. This bridge was built in 1857-58 by William Simonds, according to Framingham town records, and was mentioned by Henry David Thoreau in diary entries dated 1859. The bridge was damaged by flooding from Hurricane Diane in 1955, at which time Stonebridge Road was rerouted to a new bridge to the south. At that time, the western end was stabilized, and new wingwalls were built on the Wayland shore.

== See also ==
- List of bridges on the National Register of Historic Places in Massachusetts
- National Register of Historic Places listings in Middlesex County, Massachusetts
- National Register of Historic Places listings in Framingham, Massachusetts
