= Grace Episcopal Church (Newton, Massachusetts) =

Historic church in Massachusetts, United States

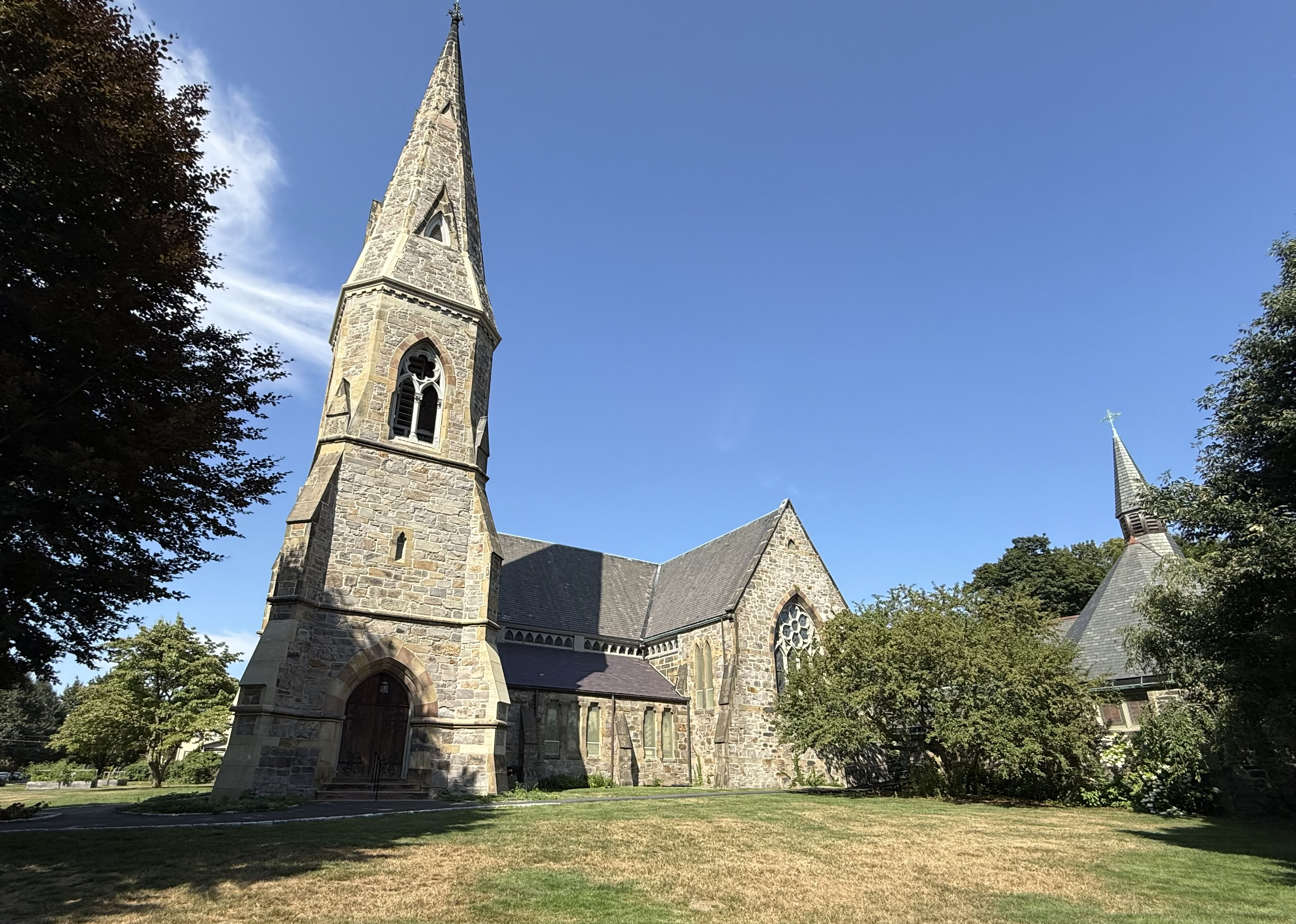
- Pictured in 2025
- Grace Episcopal Church
- 42.35320°N 71.183515°W
- Location: 76 Eldredge Street; Newton, Massachusetts, U.S.

Architecture
- Architect: Alexander R. Esty
- Completed: 1873 (153 years ago)

Grace Episcopal Church is an Episcopal church in Newton, Massachusetts, United States. Completed in 1873, it replaced an earlier, wooden church which stood at the corner of Hovey Street and Washington Street from 1858. During the rectorship of the church's third pastor, Rev. Henry Mayer, plans were made to build a new church. The first intention was to build at the corner of Hovey and Washington, but a better location was found, at the corner of Church Street and Eldredge Street, about 1.2 miles (1.9 km) to the southwest. Eldredge Street did not exist before the transition. It is named for Elizabeth Trull Eldredge, who provided the funds for the E (natural) bell at the new church.

The new church was designed by Alexander R. Esty. The cornerstone (the same one laid under the original church) was laid on September 4, 1872. Its first service was held on Advent Sunday in December 1873. The original church was removed to nearby Watertown.

A stained-glass window near the church's tower commemorates the son of Mr. and Mrs. Neff who lost his life in the Civil War. Another window is a memorial to Lizzie Shinn, the daughter of rector Rev. George Wolfe Shinn, who died of tuberculosis.

The church's baptismal font has been noted for its size: it stands over 3 feet (36 in) tall when uncovered, or 5 feet (60 in) when covered.

In 2020, the church was seeking funds to restore its bell tower.

The church is one of five in an area of around 0.5 square miles (1.3 km^{2}), the others being (from west to east) Arabic Baptist Church, Eliot Church of Newton UCC, Newton Presbyterian Church and Newton Covenant Church (located in Bigelow Junior High School).
