= First Methodist Church (Burlington, Vermont) =

Historic church in Vermont, United States

- First Methodist Church of Burlington
- U.S. National Register of Historic Places
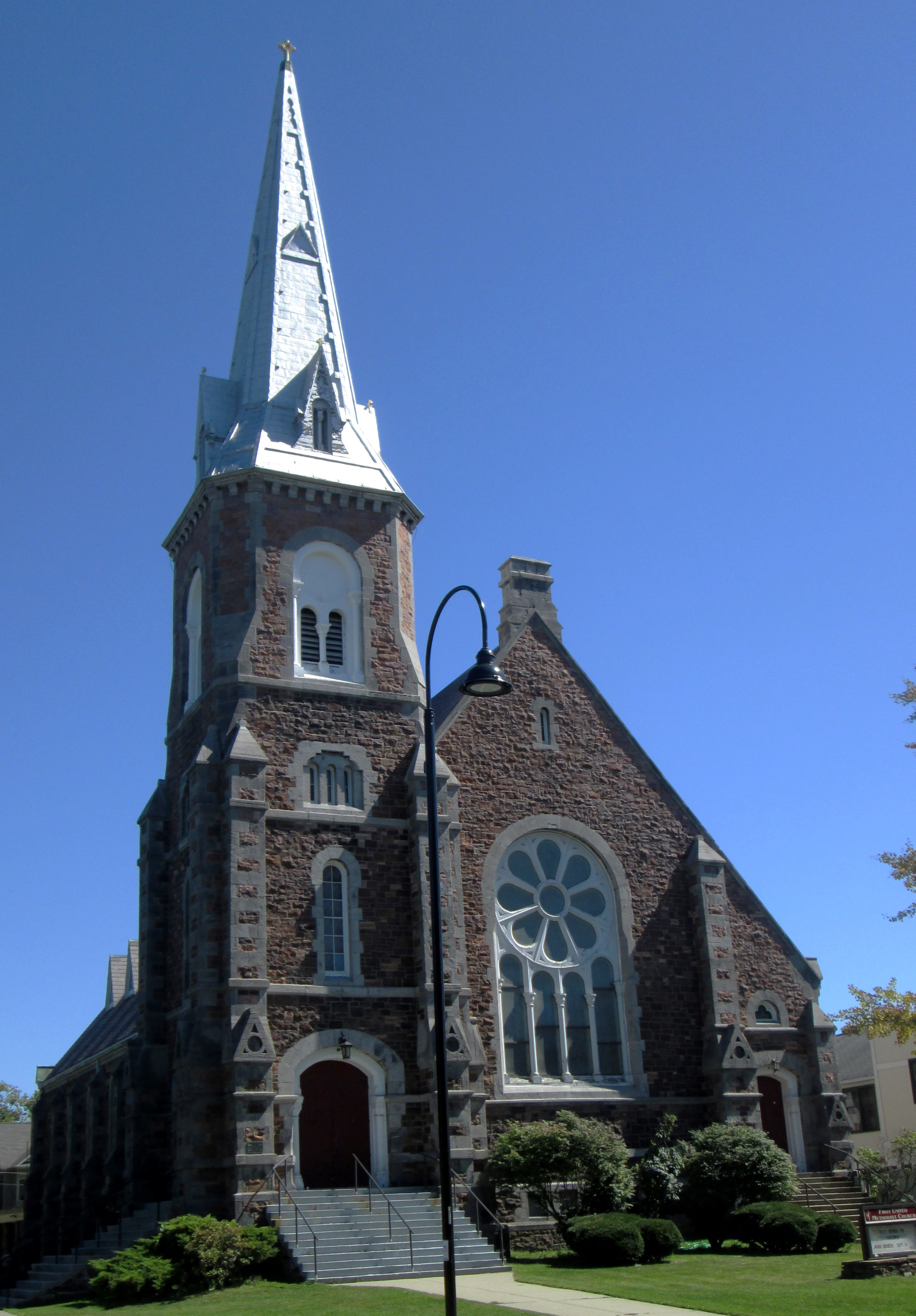
- 2013 photo

- Location within Vermont Location within the United States
- Location: 21 Buell Street at S. Winooski Ave. Burlington, Vermont
- Coordinates: 44°28′43″N 73°12′38″W
- Built: 1869
- Architect: Alexander R. Esty
- Architectural style: Romanesque Revival
- NRHP reference No.: 78000231
- Added to NRHP: October 05, 1978

The First Methodist Church of Burlington is a historic church located at 21 Buell Street (corner of S. Winooski Avenue) in Burlington, Vermont. Built in 1869 to a design by Alexander R. Esty, it is the city's only example of ecclesiastical Romanesque Revival architecture. It was listed on the National Register of Historic Places in 1978.

== Architecture and history ==
Burlington's First Methodist Church stands in downtown Burlington, at the southeast corner of Buell Street and South Winooski Avenue. It is a large masonry structure, built out of red sandstone with trim from the quarries of Isle La Motte. It is basically rectangular in shape, with a gabled roof and a square tower 147 feet (45 m) in height at its northwest corner. The styling is basically Gothic, although instead of Gothic lancet windows, most of the windows have a round-arch top, giving the building an overall Romanesque feel. Bays on the sidewalls are articulated by buttresses, as are the corners of the tower, which rises to a square louvered belfry and octagonal steeple. The church is connected at the rear via a connecting addition to its parsonage.

The church was built in 1869, on the site of Burlington's first Methodist church, which was built in 1834. It was designed by Massachusetts architect Alexander R. Esty, who is best known for a number of Gothic designs in that state. The parsonage was added in the early 20th century, using similar materials and styling, replacing the previous parsonage, which stood where Buell Street now runs. The stained glass windows were designed by J.M. Cook of Boston.

== See also ==
- National Register of Historic Places listings in Chittenden County, Vermont
