= Newton Presbyterian Church =

Church in Massachusetts, United States

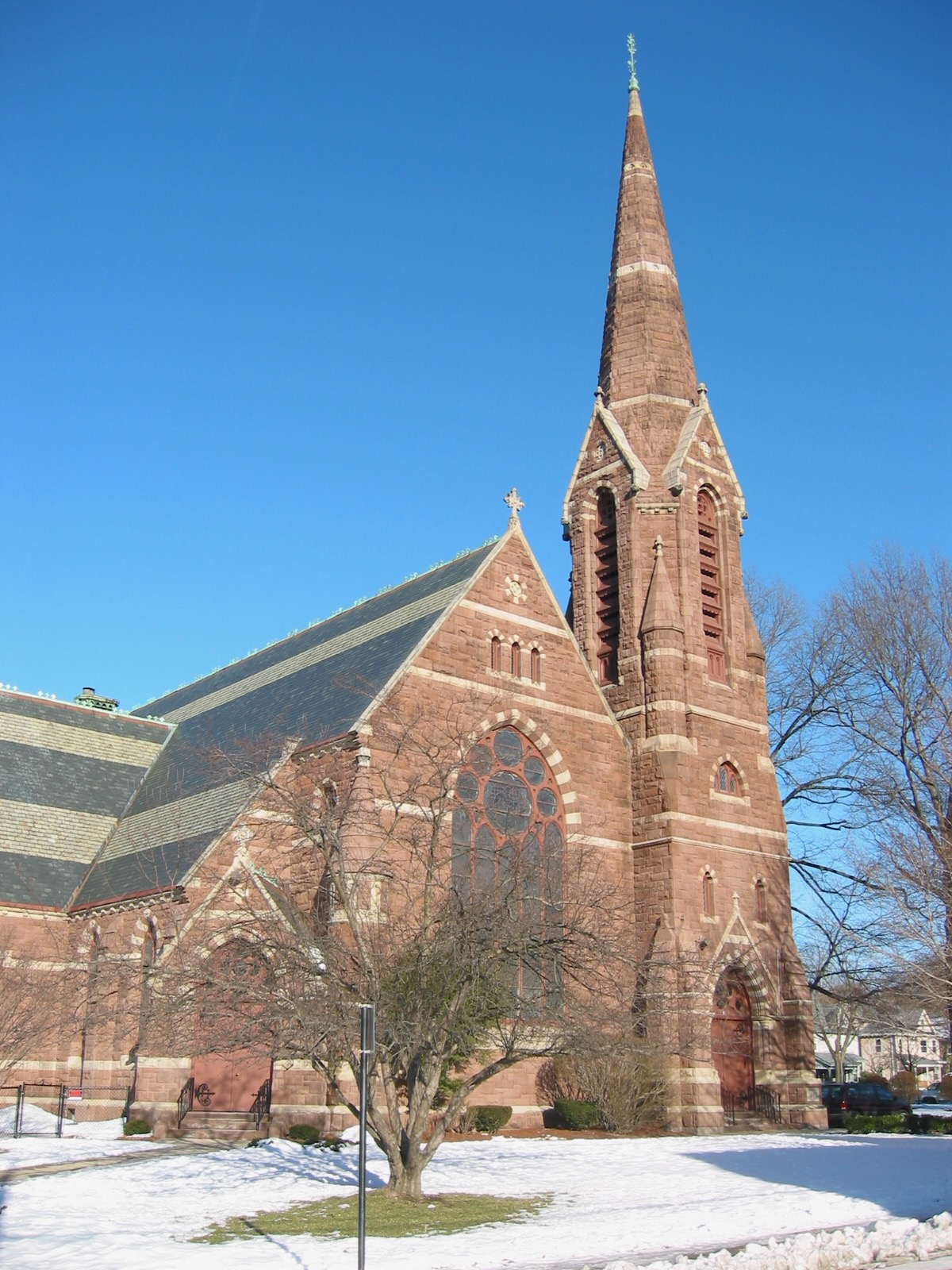
- Pictured in 2006
- Newton Presbyterian Church
- 42.355080°N 71.182821°W
- Location: 75 Vernon Street; Newton, Massachusetts, U.S.
- Denomination: Presbyterian Church (USA)

Architecture
- Completed: 1881 (145 years ago)

Clergy
- Pastor: Rev. Thomas D. Reid (since 2021)

Newton Presbyterian Church is a Presbyterian Church (USA) church in Newton, Massachusetts, United States. Completed in 1881 as Channing Unitarian Church, the church building became the congregation's home in 1945, having previously been at a church at the corner of Warren Avenue and West Brookline Street in Boston's Back Bay neighborhood. The church was rededicated on April 23, 1946.

In 2014, its congregation was spread around 126 zip codes, with around one-third of the church's members living not only outside of Newton but outside any bordering town.

In 2017, the congregation voted 107–26 to leave Presbyterian Church (USA) and join a small evangelical denomination. The church's name was changed to Newton Covenant Church. Its local authority, the Presbytery of Boston, sued the church in an attempt to regain control of the congregation, claiming the vote was unauthorized and against denomination rules. A sign installed in front of the church read "G O D I S N O W H E R E", leading to some people to read it as "God is nowhere" instead of the intended "God is now here." The congregation has since resumed its affiliation with Presbyterian Church (USA).

There have been seventeen pastors of the church since 1846. As of 2021, the position is held by Rev. Thomas D. Reid.

The church is one of five in an area of around 0.5 square miles (1.3 km^{2}), the others being (from west to east) Arabic Baptist Church, Eliot Church of Newton UCC, Grace Episcopal Church and Newton Covenant Church (located in Bigelow Junior High School).
