= National Register of Historic Places listings in Framingham, Massachusetts =

Framingham, Massachusetts, has 20 locations listed on the National Register of Historic Places.
This National Park Service list is complete through NPS recent listings posted May 1, 2026.

== Current listings ==
	Name on the Register	Image	Date listed	Location	Description
1	Concord Square Historic District	Concord Square Historic District	March 10, 1983 (#83000794)	Park, Concord, and Kendall Sts., and Union Ave. 42°16′42″N 71°25′06″W	
2	Moses Ellis House	Moses Ellis House	November 29, 1983 (#83004022)	283 Pleasant St. 42°18′16″N 71°26′58″W	
3	First Baptist Church	First Baptist Church	April 9, 1980 (#80000642)	1013 Worcester Rd. 42°18′01″N 71°26′20″W	
4	Framingham Centre Common Historic District	Framingham Centre Common Historic District	October 25, 1990 (#90001564)	Roughly centered on Framingham Centre Common, between MA 9 and Interstate 90; 42°18′13″N 71°26′08″W	
5	Framingham Railroad Station	Framingham Railroad Station	January 17, 1975 (#75000258)	417 Waverly St. 42°16′35″N 71°25′06″W	
6	Framingham Reservoir No. 1 Dam and Gatehouse	Framingham Reservoir No. 1 Dam and Gatehouse	January 18, 1990 (#89002291)	Eastern end of Framingham Reservoir No. 1, off Winter St. north of Long Ave. 42°17′30″N 71°26′34″W	
7	Framingham Reservoir No. 2 Dam and Gatehouse	Framingham Reservoir No. 2 Dam and Gatehouse	January 18, 1990 (#89002290)	Between Framingham Reservoirs Nos. 1 and 2, west of the junction of Winter and Fountain Sts. 42°16′58″N 71°26′45″W	
8	Framingham Reservoir No. 3 Dam and Gatehouse	Framingham Reservoir No. 3 Dam and Gatehouse	January 18, 1990 (#89002261)	Southeastern end of Framingham Reservoir No. 3, off MA 9/30; 42°17′38″N 71°27′36″W	
9	Paul Gibbs House	Paul Gibbs House	March 10, 1983 (#83000804)	1147 Edmands Rd. 42°19′49″N 71°28′52″W	
10	Irving Square Historic District	Irving Square Historic District	November 30, 1982 (#82000491)	Irving Square, Waverly, South, Columbia, Irving, Gordon and Hollis Sts. 42°16′32″N 71°25′01″W	
11	Lake Cochituate Dam	Lake Cochituate Dam	January 18, 1990 (#89002250)	Northwestern side of Lake Cochituate; 42°16′32″N 71°25′36″W	
12	R. H. Long Company Factory		November 2, 2023 (#100009507)	59 Fountain St. 42°18′54″N 71°23′05″W	
13	Nobscot Union Chapel		November 2, 2023 (#100009508)	871 Edgell Road; 42°19′40″N 71°26′09″W	
14	Saint John's Episcopal Church	Saint John's Episcopal Church	January 12, 1990 (#89002300)	Maynard Rd. and Church St. 42°17′50″N 71°26′21″W	Now the Ecumenical Center at Framingham State University.
15	Saxonville Historic District	Saxonville Historic District	August 20, 1992 (#92000992)	Roughly along Elm, Danforth, Central, Water and Concord Sts. 42°19′29″N 71°24′04″W	
16	Stone's Bridge	Stone's Bridge	January 17, 2017 (#100000527)	Old Stonebridge Rd. across Sudbury River; 42°20′21″N 71°23′42″W	Mainly in Wayland
17	Sudbury Aqueduct Linear District	Sudbury Aqueduct Linear District	January 18, 1990 (#89002293)	Along Sudbury Aqueduct from Farm Pond at Waverly St. (Framingham) to Chestnut Hill Reservoir (Newton); 42°17′33″N 71°18′44″W	Extends into Wellesley and Needham in Norfolk County, and Sherborn, Natick and Newton in Middlesex County.
18	Sudbury Dam Historic District	Sudbury Dam Historic District	January 18, 1990 (#89002265)	Southeastern end of Sudbury Reservoir off MA 30; 42°18′21″N 71°29′30″W	Extends into Southborough, Worcester County.
19	Weston Aqueduct Linear District	Weston Aqueduct Linear District	January 18, 1990 (#89002274)	Along the Weston Aqueduct from the Sudbury Reservoir to the Weston Reservoir; 42°20′00″N 71°22′32″W	Extends into Southborough, Worcester County, and Weston and Wayland in Middlesex County.
20	Whit's Diner	Whit's Diner	December 4, 2003 (#03001243)	184A Fountain St. 42°16′31″N 71°26′02″W	
