= Saxonville, Massachusetts =

Saxonville
- Village
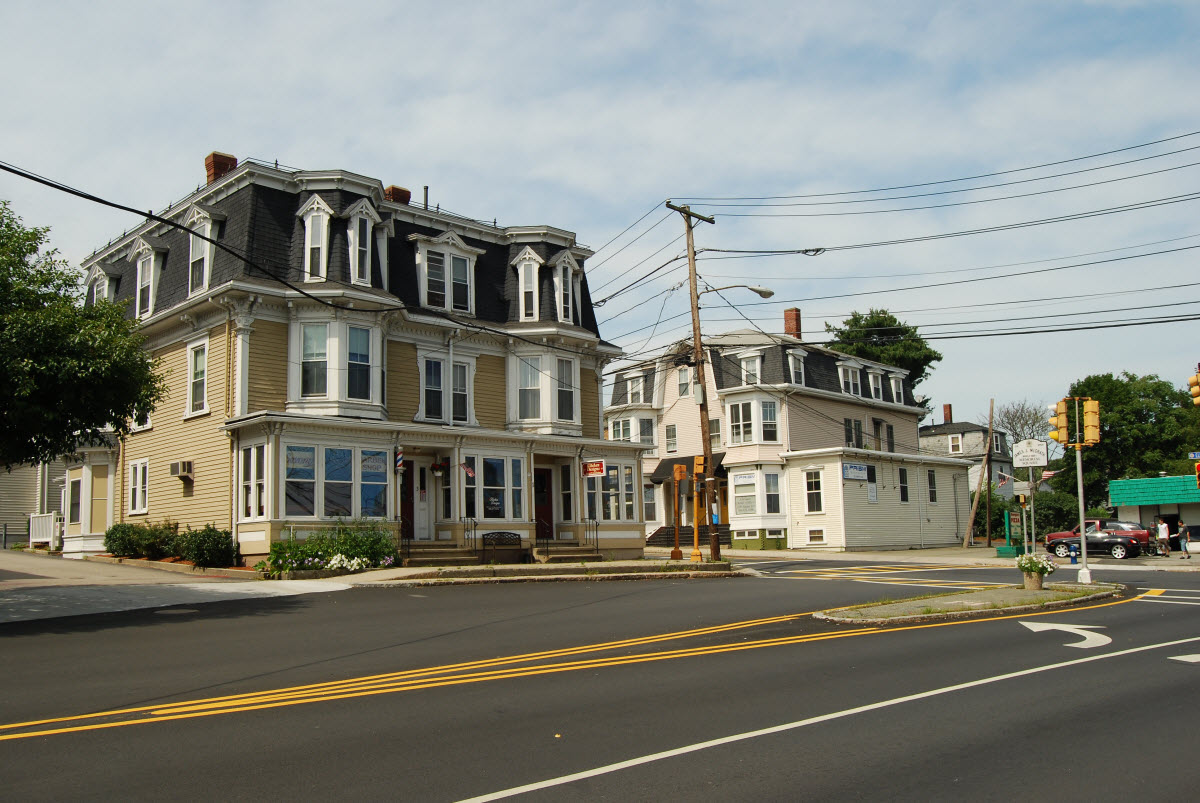
- Interactive map of Saxonville
- Coordinates: 42°19′35″N 71°23′58″W
- Country: United States
- State: Massachusetts
- County: Middlesex
- City: Framingham

Saxonville is a village located in northern Framingham, in Middlesex County, Massachusetts, United States. The village was originally settled by John Stone in 1647. Saxonville was named after the Saxon Factory Company, a textile mill in the village.

== Geography ==
Saxonville is located at 42.3203°N, 71.4404°W on the Sudbury River.

== History ==
Native Americans lived and fished in the area of the Sudbury falls for centuries up through the 18th century.

The first industry in Framingham was a grist mill that John Stone erected at the falls on the river, granted by Act of the Great and General Court of Massachusetts. In May 1656, Edmund Rice and Peter Noyes surveyed 11 acres (45,000 m^{2}) of land purchased by John Stone of Sudbury from the Indians that was supplemented by a grant of the General Court to Stone of an additional 50 acres (200,000 m^{2}) at the Sudbury River falls. The mill rights were held by the Stone family for nearly two centuries when it became Saxonville Mills.

In 1865, a dam was constructed across the river, the remnants of the dam's control gates and gears can still be seen near the falls at Central Street, near the intersection of Central and Water Streets. An underground channel supplied water from above the falls to the manufacturing plant where it was used to drive water wheels or turbines to provide mechanical manufacturing power at the mill. The lower portion of the 1858 section of the mill where waste water exited the turbines and poured into the lower portion of the river is now behind flood control walls.

Through the 1960s, Saxonville still had its own operating dairy in a high, flat area on Danforth street about 3/4-mile east of the village center. The Twin Maple Farms dairy was located just east of Meadow Street, bounded by Danforth Street. The dairy maintained a small herd of dairy cows located in fields near Danforth Street. Until 1966, the dairy operated a fleet of delivery trucks that delivered fresh milk and dairy products to homes around area. Sometime around 1967 the dairy ceased operations. The dairy's milking machines and bottling facility were left idle and slowly deteriorated through in the early 1970s. The site is now occupied by residences.

The town operated the Saxonville Elementary School on the hilly portion of Elm Street, just above the village. Originally a wooden school house that held four large classrooms on two floors, it was replaced with a newer structure during the New Deal era Works Progress Administration. The original structure became known as the annex, and was still used into the 1960s. The building was razed in the 1970s when the town constructed a new gymnasium and cafeteria addition to the building. The school is now known as the Mary E. Stapleton school after a local school instructor and principal.

== See also ==
- Saxonville Historic District, encompassing a part of the village
