= Lloyd's Diner =

- Whit's Diner
- U.S. National Register of Historic Places
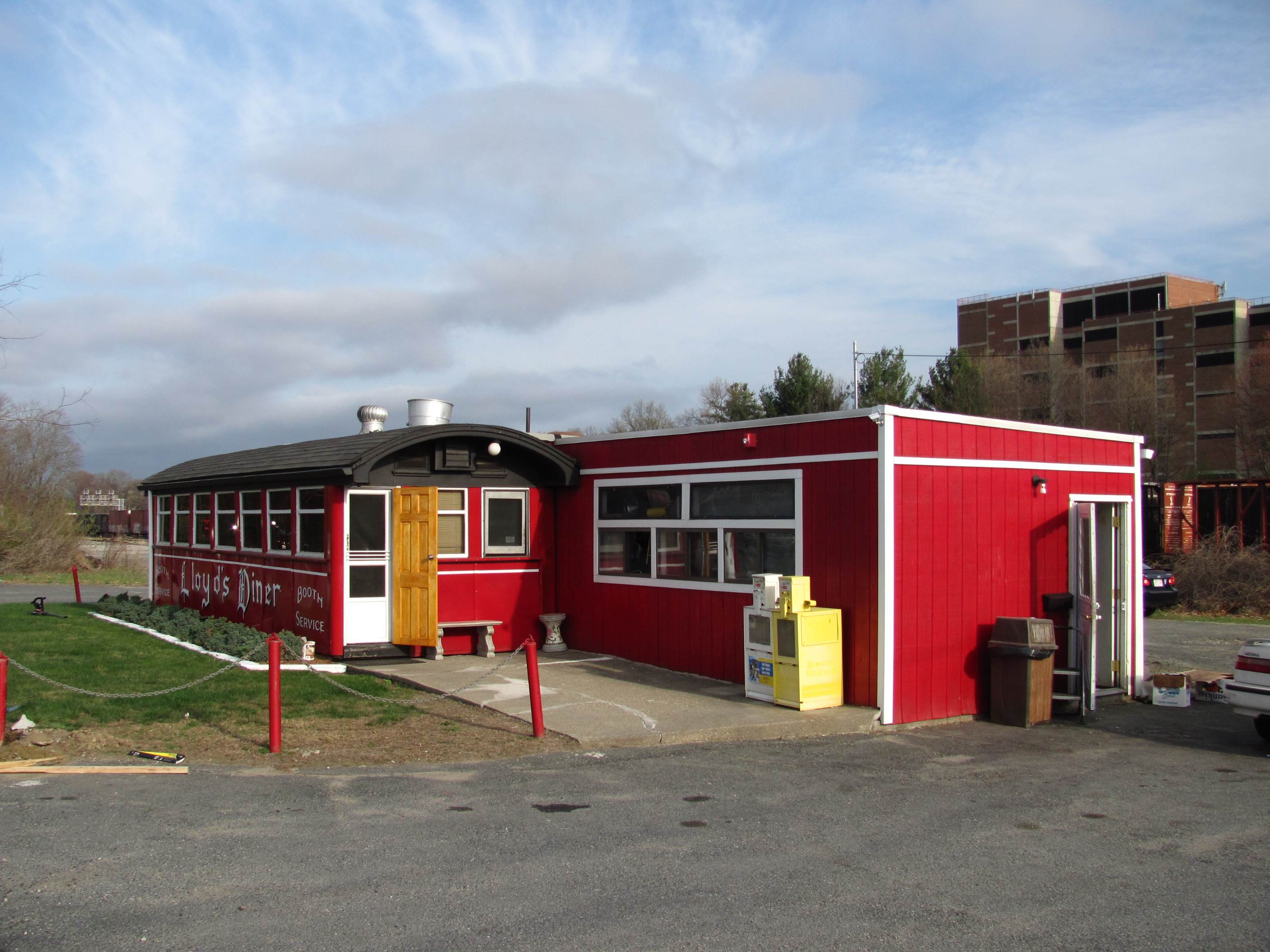
- Whit's Diner (now Lloyd's Diner)

- Location within Massachusetts Location within the United States
- Location: Framingham, Massachusetts
- Coordinates: 42°16′31″N 71°26′2″W
- Architect: Worcester Lunch Car Company
- MPS: Diners of Massachusetts MPS
- NRHP reference No.: 03001243
- Added to NRHP: December 4, 2003

Lloyd's Diner is a historic diner at 184A Fountain Street in Framingham, Massachusetts. Formerly Whit's Diner in Orange, Massachusetts, it was moved its present location in 1990. Built as #783 by the Worcester Lunch Car Company in 1942, it was operated by Robert and Richard Whitney until about 1960 as Whit's, and then under other ownership as the Orange Diner. It was purchased by Richard and Joan Lloyd in 1990 and moved to Framingham.

The diner was listed on the National Register of Historic Places in 2003.

== See also ==
- National Register of Historic Places listings in Framingham, Massachusetts
