= Paul Gibbs House =

Historic house in Massachusetts, United States

- U.S. National Register of Historic Places
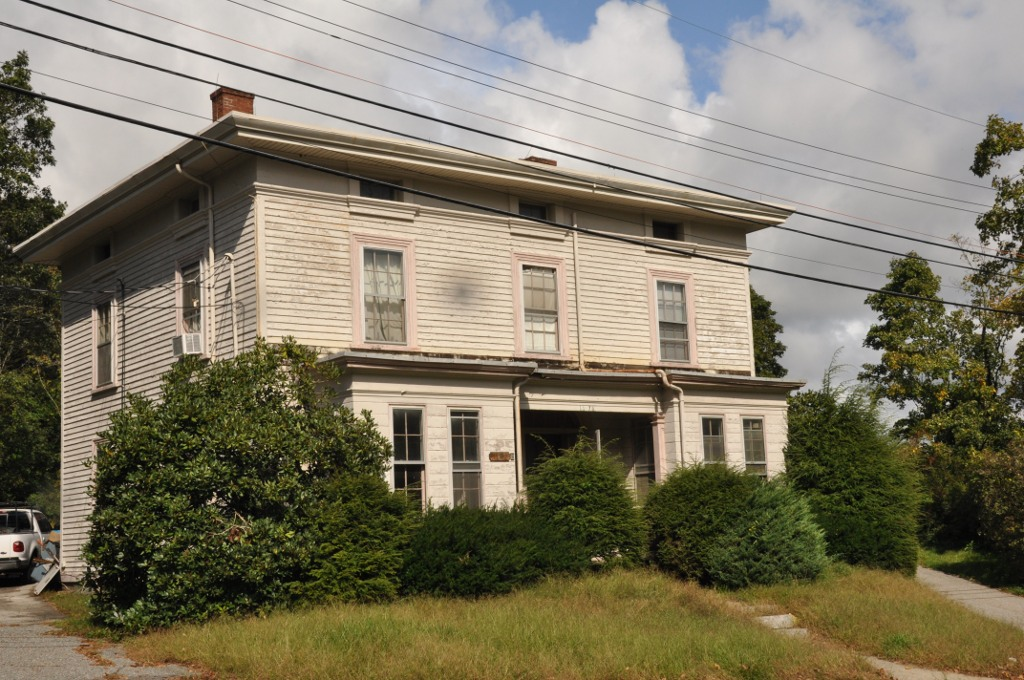

- Location within Massachusetts Location within the United States
- Location: 1147 Edmands Rd., Framingham, Massachusetts
- Coordinates: 42°19′49″N 71°28′52″W
- Area: less than one acre
- Built: 1860
- Architect: Esty, Alexander Rice
- Architectural style: Italianate
- NRHP reference No.: 83000804
- Added to NRHP: March 10, 1983

The Paul Gibbs House is a historic house at 1147 Edmands Road in Framingham, Massachusetts, US. Built in 1860 for a member of a prominent local family, it is a good example of Italianate architecture, probably the work of noted local architect Alexander Rice Esty. The house was listed on the National Register of Historic Places in 1983.

== Description and history ==
The Paul Gibbs House stands in a rural area of northwestern Framingham, on the north side of Edmands Road, between Pine Hill and Nixon Roads. It is a two-story wood-frame structure, with a low-pitch hip roof and mostly clapboarded exterior. The roof has extended eaves, below which are shallow attic windows. The main facade is three bays wide, with a pair of projecting rectangular bays on either side of the main entrance. The entrance is flanked by sidelight windows and topped by a rounded transom window. A series of ells extends to the rear of the main block.

The house was probably designed by architect Alexander Rice Esty, and built c. 1860 for Paul Gibbs. The attribution to Esty is based on surviving architectural elements that are similar to other documented works of his in Framingham. Gibbs was a member of the locally prominent Gibbs family, who had been major landowners of northwestern Framingham since the early 18th century, and the house was built around the time of his marriage. It is the last surviving house of a series of Gibbs family homes built in the area. The property associated with the house remained in use as farmland into the 1970s, although this house was converted in the 20th century for use as a tenant house by farm workers.

== See also ==
- National Register of Historic Places listings in Framingham, Massachusetts
