= First Baptist Church (Framingham, Massachusetts) =

Historic church in Massachusetts, United States

- U.S. National Register of Historic Places
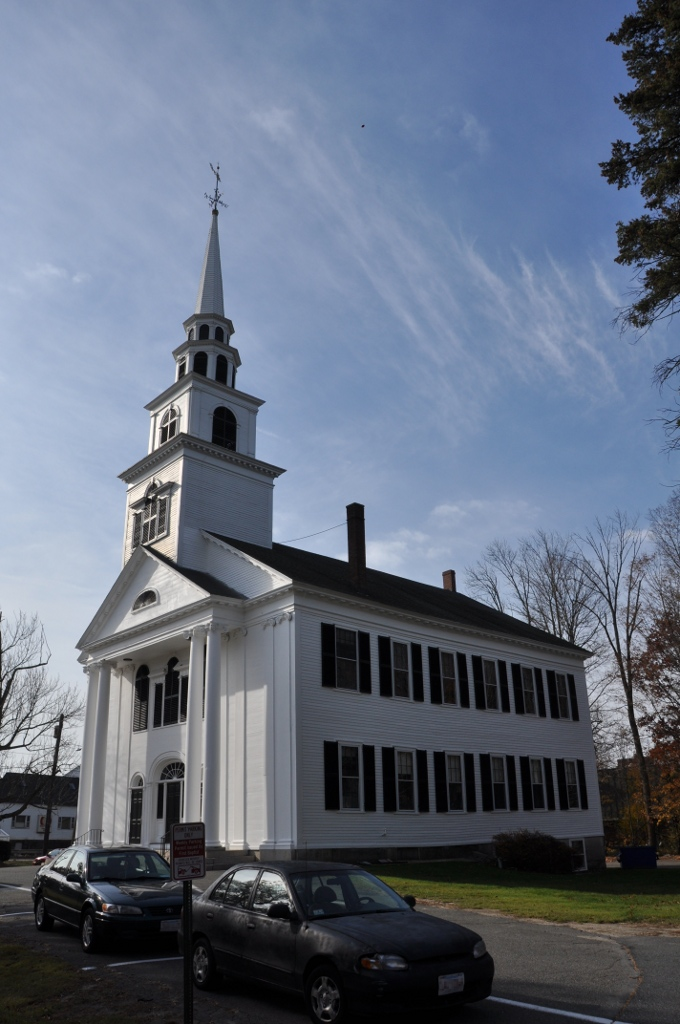

- Location within Massachusetts Location within the United States
- Location: Framingham, Massachusetts
- Coordinates: 42°18′1.12″N 71°26′19.9″W
- Built: 1826, 1881
- Architect: Hartwell and Richardson
- Architectural style: Late Gothic Revival
- NRHP reference No.: 80000642
- Added to NRHP: April 9, 1980

The First Baptist Church is an historic Baptist church on 1013 Worcester Road (Massachusetts Route 9) in Framingham, Massachusetts.

== History ==
The cornerstone of the First Baptist Church was laid in 1826. The first services were held on January 1, 1827 by the Rev. Charles Train. Originally an "open" basement for the horses to stay dry during worship services, the Sanctuary floor was raised around 1881 and the basement closed in. Around 1888 a 4-room addition was added on the west side (rear) of building along with a baptismal on the altar stage. With the exception of some major renovations around 1998 to make the building handicap accessible, the building remains much as it was the day it was built. The original box pews were replaced by curved padded pews in the late 1800s, however the original box pews still exist in the balcony. Also still intact, however sealed in from the Main Sanctuary, are the original Negro galleries which were closed off around 1849

In 1854 several members left with a "mothers blessing" to create the South Framingham Baptist Church in South Framingham. The name was changed to Park Street Baptist Church shortly thereafter. Major renovations were completed on the church in 1881. In 1998 due to dwindling membership in both congregations, the members of First Baptist Church and Park Street Baptist Church began worshipping together. In 2002 The members of Park Street Baptist Church officially rejoined First Baptist Church as one congregation now known as the First Baptist Church in Framingham.

The church building was listed on the National Register of Historic Places in 1980.

== See also ==
- National Register of Historic Places listings in Framingham, Massachusetts
- List of places of worship in Framingham, Massachusetts
