= St. John's Episcopal Church (Framingham, Massachusetts) =

Historic church in Massachusetts, United States

- Saint John's Episcopal Church
- U.S. National Register of Historic Places
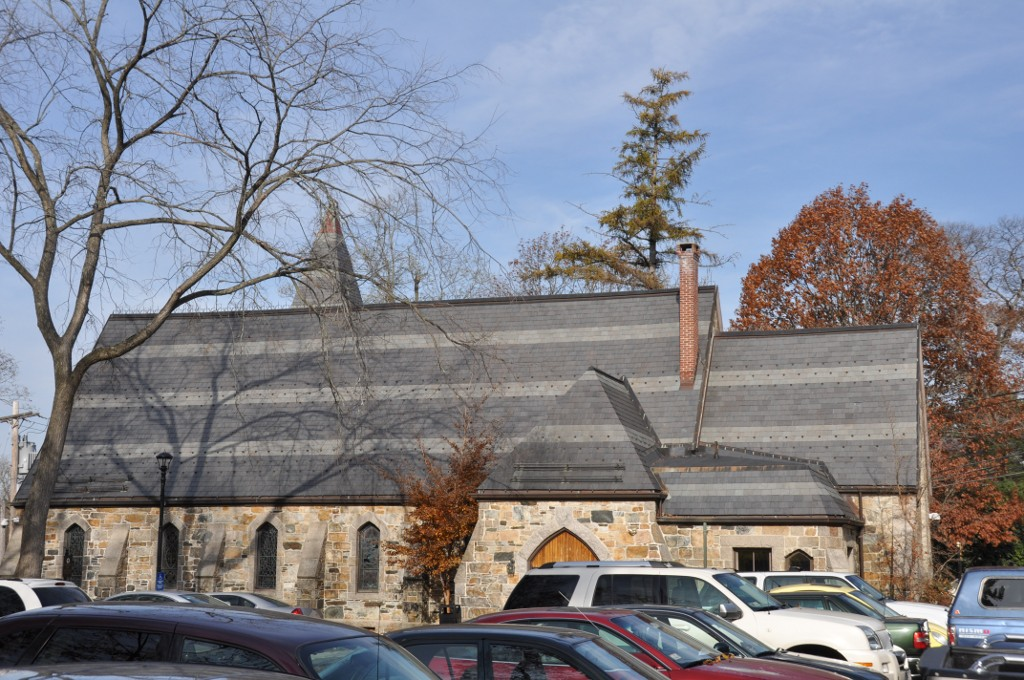

- Location within Massachusetts Location within the United States
- Location: Framingham, Massachusetts
- Coordinates: 42°17′50″N 71°26′21″W
- Built: 1871
- Architect: Esty, Alexander Rice
- Architectural style: Gothic Revival
- NRHP reference No.: 89002300
- Added to NRHP: January 12, 1990

The former St. John's Episcopal Church is an historic church building on Maynard Road and Church Street in Framingham, Massachusetts. It is now the Heineman Ecumenical Center at Framingham State University. The university acquired the building in 1969. The church building was designed by local architect Alexander Rice Esty, and was built in 1871. Esty was a member of the congregation for which it was built, and donated his services.

The building was listed on the National Register of Historic Places on January 12, 1990.

== See also ==
- National Register of Historic Places listings in Framingham, Massachusetts
