= Framingham Reservoir No. 2 Dam and Gatehouse =

- U.S. National Register of Historic Places
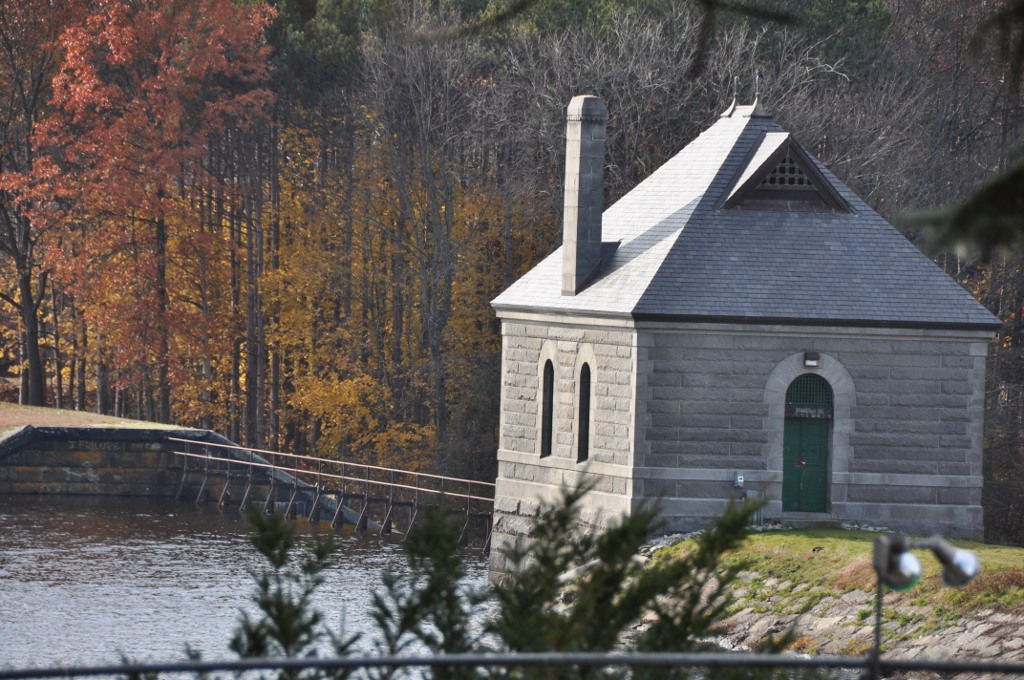
- Framingham Reservoir No. 2 Gatehouse

- Location within Massachusetts Location within the United States
- Location: Framingham, Massachusetts
- Coordinates: 42°16′58″N 71°26′45″W
- Built: 1877–1879
- Architect: George A. Clough
- MPS: Water Supply System of Metropolitan Boston MPS
- NRHP reference No.: 89002290
- Added to NRHP: January 18, 1990

The Framingham Reservoir No. 2 Dam and Gatehouse is a historic waterworks facility in Framingham, Massachusetts, United States. The dam and gatehouse are located west of the junction of Winter and Fountain Streets and impound a branch of the Sudbury River. The reservoir, also known as the Brackett Reservoir, was built between 1877 and 1879 as part of an expansion of the water supply for the city of Boston.

The dam is 1,376 feet (419 m) long, with a centered overfall area. Its core consists of granite rubble laid in cement, with earthen embankments. The overfall section is faced on the downstream side with cut granite and on the upstream side with earth. The dam is capped with granite and originally had iron mounts for flashboards.

The gatehouse is a rectangular granite structure with a steep hip roof, a brick chimney, and an eyebrow dormer. Its door and windows are set in round-arch openings. The gatehouse contains controls for regulating water flow from the reservoir, as well as from a 4-foot (1.2 m) pipe connected to Reservoir No. 1 and a 2-foot (0.61 m) pipe connected to the Ashland Reservoir.

The dam was built by contractors from upstate New York, while the gatehouse was constructed by James Fagin of Boston to a design by Boston city architect George A. Clough. The Metropolitan Water Board, established in 1895 to oversee Boston's water supply, took the reservoir out of service soon afterward due to its poor water quality.

The dam and gatehouse were listed on the National Register of Historic Places in 1990.

== See also ==
- Framingham Reservoir No. 1 Dam and Gatehouse
- Framingham Reservoir No. 3 Dam and Gatehouse
- Sudbury Aqueduct
- National Register of Historic Places listings in Framingham, Massachusetts
