= Saxonville Historic District =

Historic district in Massachusetts, United States

- U.S. National Register of Historic Places
- U.S. Historic district
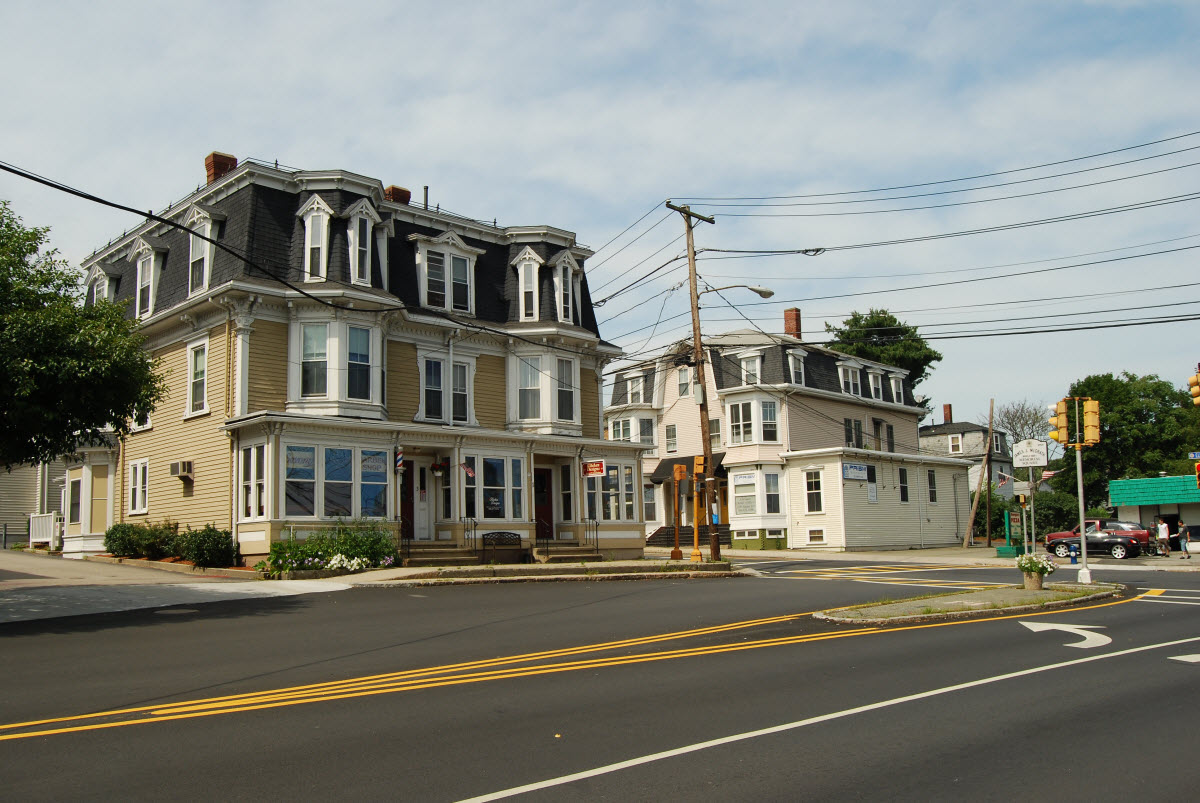

- Location within Massachusetts Location within the United States
- Location: Framingham, Massachusetts
- Coordinates: 42°19′29″N 71°24′4″W
- Area: 56.75 acres (22.97 ha)
- Built: 1823
- Architect: Multiple
- Architectural style: Greek Revival, Second Empire, Italianate
- NRHP reference No.: 92000992
- Added to NRHP: August 20, 1992

The Saxonville Historic District of Framingham, Massachusetts, encompasses a historic 19th century mill village at the heart of Saxonville. The district is centered on the mill complex at the junction of Water, Central, Elm, and Concord Streets, radiating north on Elm Street and west on Water Street. The extant mill brick and concrete buildings were built after fires destroyed older mill buildings in the 1880s by the Roxbury Carpet Company, whose owner, Michael Simpson, had successfully orchestrated the commercial production of carpets in a single facility. The district includes mill worker housing, some of which dates to the 1820s, as well as private residential development from the period, and a cluster of commercial and civic buildings adjacent to the mill complex.

The district was listed on the National Register of Historic Places in 1992.

== See also ==
- National Register of Historic Places listings in Framingham, Massachusetts
