= Moses Ellis House =

Historic house in Massachusetts, United States

- U.S. National Register of Historic Places
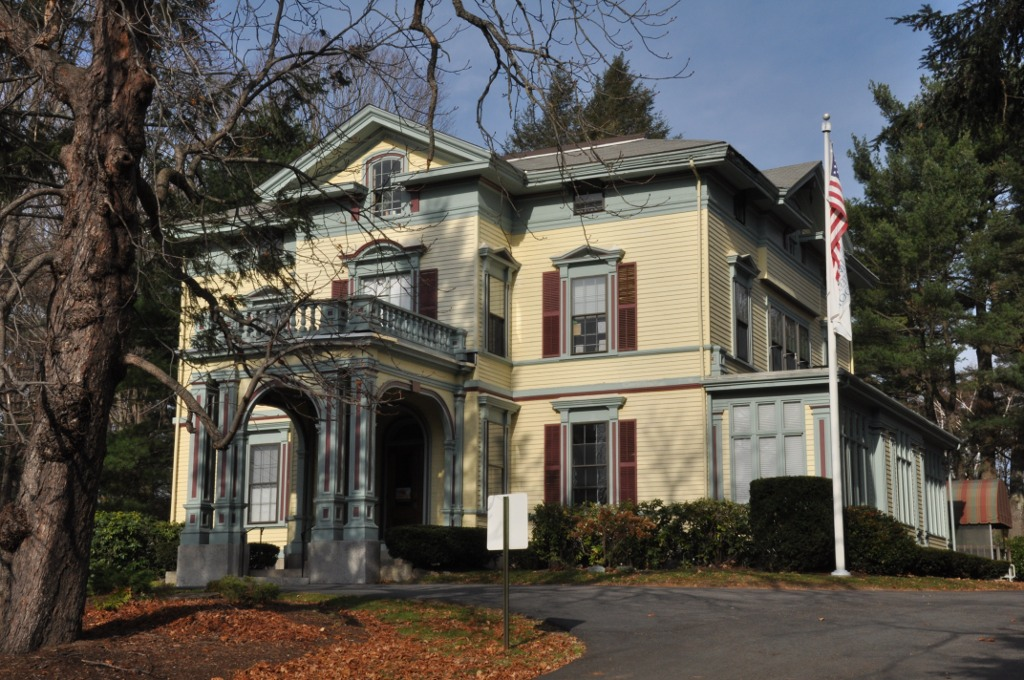

- Location within Massachusetts Location within the United States
- Location: Framingham, Massachusetts
- Coordinates: 42°18′16″N 71°26′58″W
- Built: 1866
- Architect: Esty, Alexander Rice
- Architectural style: Italianate
- NRHP reference No.: 83004022
- Added to NRHP: November 29, 1983

The Moses Ellis House is a historic house located at 283 Pleasant Street in Framingham, Massachusetts.

== Description and history ==
The 2 1/2-story wood-frame house was designed by local architect Alexander Rice Esty and built c. 1866 for Moses Ellis, a well-to-do local farmer. The house has a distinctive front facade, with a square projecting gable-end section from which a porte cochere protrudes. The gable of the projection has a nearly pedimented end, with an oval-arched window, a motif repeated in a slightly projecting gable on the house's right facade. In the early 20th century the house was home to a school for boys.

The house was listed on the National Register of Historic Places on November 29, 1983.

== See also ==
- National Register of Historic Places listings in Framingham, Massachusetts
