= Irving Square Historic District =

Historic district in Massachusetts, United States

- U.S. National Register of Historic Places
- U.S. Historic district
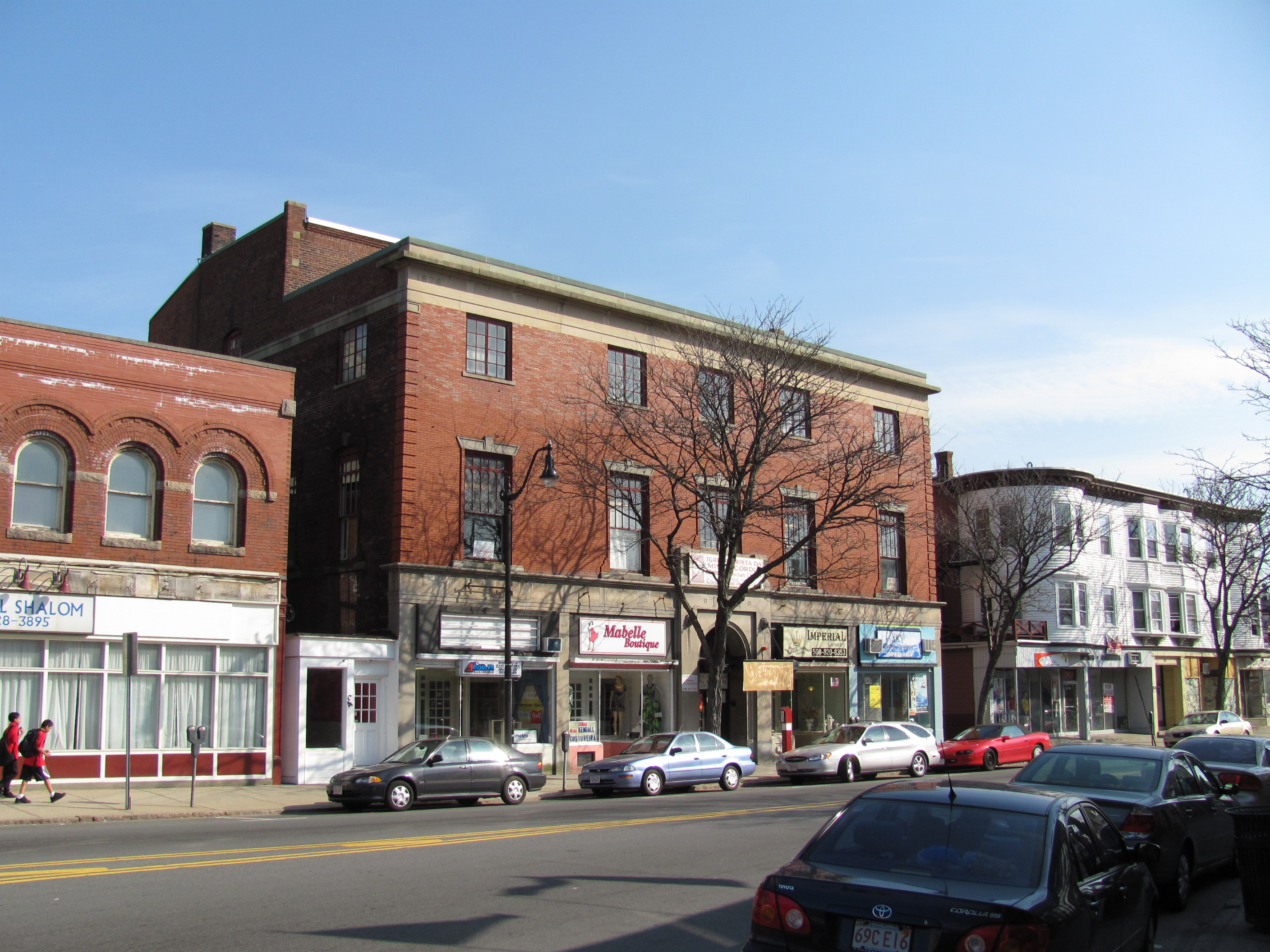
- Odd Fellows Building

- Location within Massachusetts Location within the United States
- Location: Framingham, Massachusetts
- Coordinates: 42°16′32″N 71°25′1″W
- Built: 1876
- Architect: Baker, Charles M.; Multiple
- Architectural style: Colonial Revival, Classical Revival
- NRHP reference No.: 82000491
- Added to NRHP: November 30, 1982

The Irving Square Historic District is a historic district on Irving Square, Waverly, South, Columbia, Irving, Gordon and Hollis Streets in Framingham, Massachusetts. It encompasses a portion of the town's central business district just south of the railroad tracks. It includes buildings on Hollis Street, extending south from Irving Street to Gordon Street, and buildings on Irving from Hollis to just beyond Columbia Street. Most of these commercial buildings were built between 1890 and 1930, most in the 20th century. The district was listed on the National Register of Historic Places in 1982.

== See also ==
- Concord Square Historic District, just north of the railroad tracks
- National Register of Historic Places listings in Framingham, Massachusetts
