= Lake Cochituate Dam =

- U.S. National Register of Historic Places
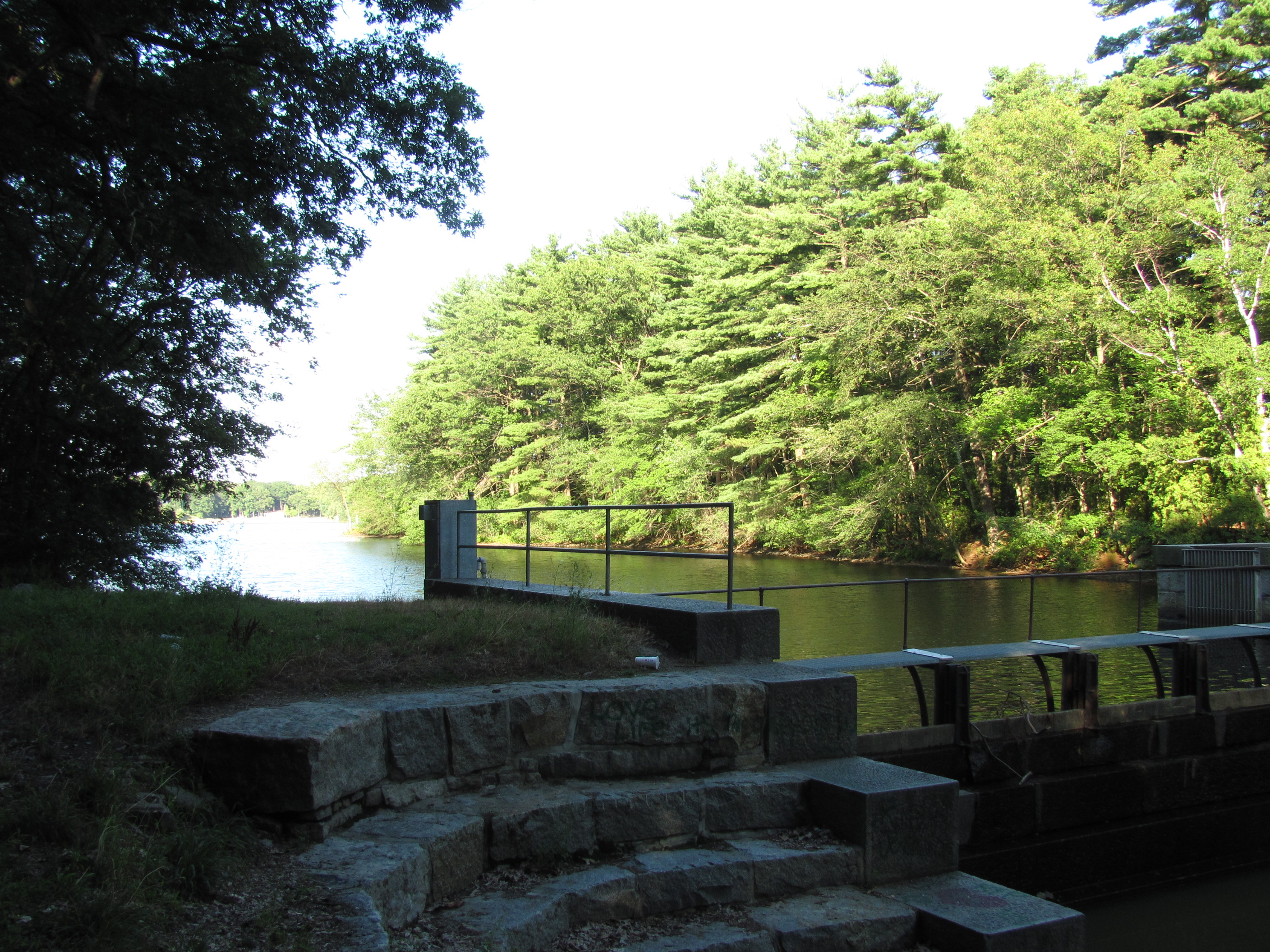
- Lake Cochituate Dam

- Location within Massachusetts Location within the United States
- Location: Framingham, Massachusetts
- Coordinates: 42°18′54″N 71°23′5″W
- Built: 1890
- Architect: Edmond Fitzgerald
- MPS: Water Supply System of Metropolitan Boston MPS
- NRHP reference No.: 89002250
- Added to NRHP: January 18, 1990

The Lake Cochituate Dam is a historic dam on the southwestern side of Lake Cochituate in Framingham, Massachusetts. The 62-foot (19 m) dam was built in 1890, replacing two earlier wooden dams, dating back to the 1846 construction of the Cochituate Aqueduct. The core of the dam is granite rubble laid in concrete. Lake Cochituate was taken out of service as part of Boston's public water supply in the 1930s, and the lake and dam were eventually turned over to the state, which established Cochituate State Park.

The dam was listed on the National Register of Historic Places in 1990.

== See also ==
- National Register of Historic Places listings in Framingham, Massachusetts
