= Framingham Reservoir No. 1 Dam and Gatehouse =

- U.S. National Register of Historic Places
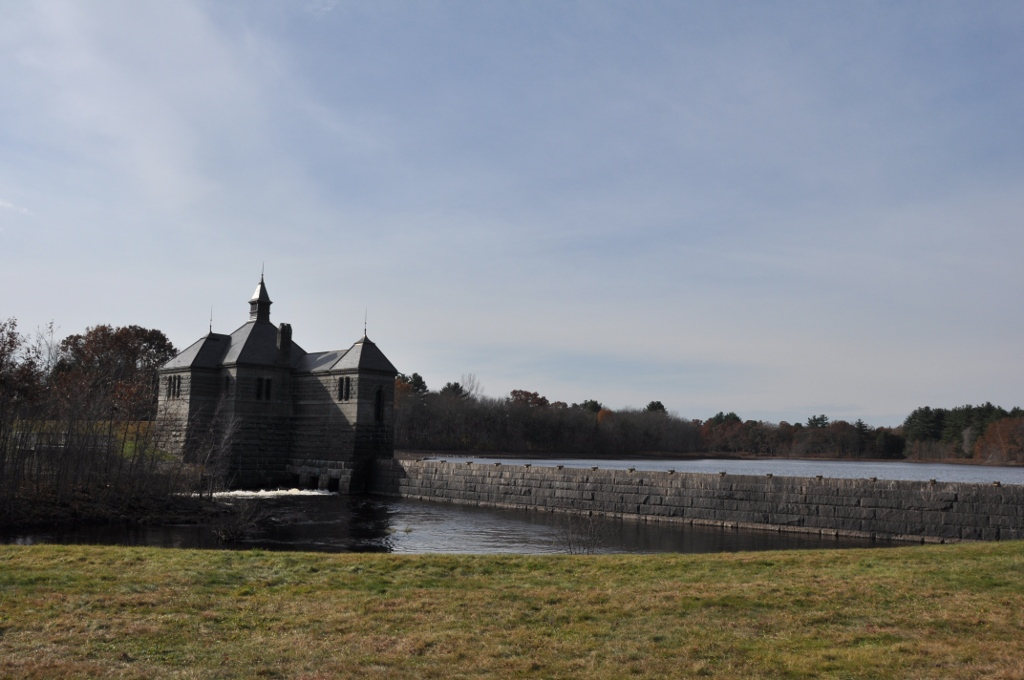

- Location within Massachusetts Location within the United States
- Location: Framingham, Massachusetts
- Coordinates: 42°17′30″N 71°26′34″W
- Built: 1878
- Architect: George Albert Clough
- MPS: Water Supply System of Metropolitan Boston MPS
- NRHP reference No.: 89002291
- Added to NRHP: January 18, 1990

The Framingham Reservoir No. 1 Dam and Gatehouse is a historic water works facility in Framingham, Massachusetts, United States. This complex is located at the end of Framingham Reservoir No. 1, which is also known as the Stearns Reservoir, off Winter Street and north of Long Avenue. Constructed from 1876 to 1878 as part of an expansion of the water supply of the city of Boston, this was designed by its first city architect George A. Clough. The historical purpose of the reservoir, which was located at the confluence of two branches of the Sudbury River, was primarily to control the river's water level, and secondarily to provide reserve supply capacity. The reservoir's reserve capacity was generally used only as a backup supply, as the reservoir's muddy bottom made it a less desirable source than reservoir No. 3 upstream. However the reservoir No. 1 system was nonetheless important due to its role in controlling the flow of the river downstream, and due to the gatehouse which controlled the water flows for all the Framingham reservoirs into the Sudbury Aqueduct. Reservoir No. 1 is no longer maintained as a reserve water source, although it is still owned by the Massachusetts Water Resources Authority, successor to the Boston Water Board which oversaw its construction. MWRA retains ownership as the gatehouse contains the connection between Reservoir No. 3 and the Sudbury Aqueduct which remain part of the emergency water systems.

The dam measures 793 feet (242 m) in length, with an overfall area that is 169 feet (52 m) long. The embankments are 20 feet (6.1 m) wide, with a core of granite rubble laid in cement. The overfall area is topped with cut granite, and originally had wooden flashboards held in by pins. The gatehouse is a 1 1/2-story granite structure, designed by Boston city architect George Clough. Located at the southern end of the overfall, it houses one end of the Sudbury Aqueduct extension pipe from Farm Pond, a 4-foot (1.2 m) pipe connecting this reservoir to numbers 2 and 3, and gates for channeling water either into the aqueduct or into the river. The gates allowed water to be selectively channeled from any of the reservoirs (1, 2, or 3) into the Sudbury Aqueduct or into the river below the dam. There are also flood gates and equipment for moving the dam's flashboards. Today the gatehouse, Sudbury Aqueduct, and the pipes from reservoir number 3 remain part of MWRA's emergency systems. If activated, the water from reservoir number 3 flows from the dam number 1 gatehouse down the Sudbury Aqueduct extension pipe to a gatehouse at Farm Pond where it enters the Sudbury Aqueduct proper which in turn brings the water to the Chestnut Hill Reservoir.

The dam and gatehouse were listed on the National Register of Historic Places in 1990.

== See also ==
- Framingham Reservoir No. 2 Dam and Gatehouse
- Framingham Reservoir No. 3 Dam and Gatehouse
- Sudbury Aqueduct
- National Register of Historic Places listings in Framingham, Massachusetts
