= Framingham Reservoir No. 3 Dam and Gatehouse =

- U.S. National Register of Historic Places
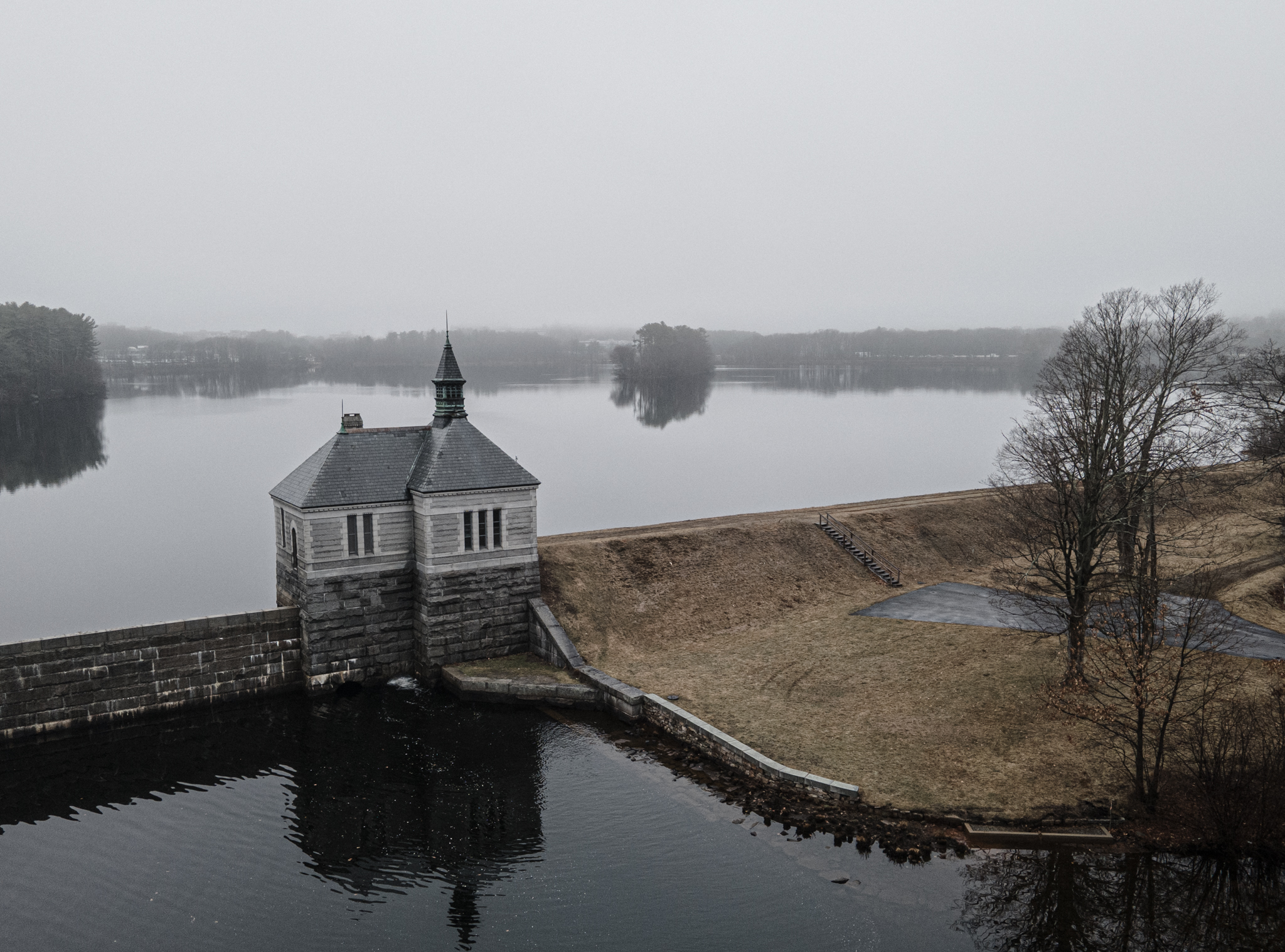

- Location within Massachusetts Location within the United States
- Location: Framingham, Massachusetts
- Coordinates: 42°17′38″N 71°27′36″W
- Built: 1876
- Architect: George Clough
- MPS: Water Supply System of Metropolitan Boston MPS
- NRHP reference No.: 89002261
- Added to NRHP: January 18, 1990

The Framingham Reservoir No. 3 Dam and Gatehouse is a historic waterworks facility in Framingham, Massachusetts, United States. The dam and gatehouse are located at the southeastern end of Framingham Reservoir No. 3, off Massachusetts Route 9. They were built 1876–78 as part of an expansion of the public water supply of the city of Boston. The dam is 2,280 feet (690 m) long, and impounds an area of 253 acres (102 ha) in the Sudbury River watershed. The reservoir is the largest of the three Framingham reservoirs that were built at that time. The dam's core is constructed of granite rubble laid in cement. There is a granite-lined overfall area 100 feet (30 m) long, which was originally topped by flashboards. At the end of the overfall area nearest Route 9 stands the gatehouse, a granite structure with a rectangular main block and a smaller wing. Both sections have a steeply pitched slate roof. The door is in a round-arch recess, and the building is capped by a cupola. It houses controls for two 4-foot (1.2 m) mains connected to the Sudbury Aqueduct via the gatehouse at Reservoir No. 1. The water is directed either directly beyond the dam into Reservoir 1 or through the 4-foot mains to the Sudbury Aqueduct gatehouse.

The dam was built by contractors from Worcester, and the gatehouse was built by Benjamin Dewing of Boston to a design by the Boston city architect, George Clough. Since its construction, the reservoir, which is also known as the Foss Reservoir, has been connected by an open channel to the Sudbury Reservoir (in 1898), and had its shore areas resurfaced (in 1907–08). Nearly all of the reservoir's water comes from the Sudbury Reservoir as its own natural watershed is very limited. Of the Framingham Reservoirs, Reservoir #3 is the only one that was regularly used throughout its time as an active water source due to its better water quality than the reservoirs to the south. The reservoir is no longer in active service though it is maintained as an emergency source. It is the only one of the Framingham reservoirs still maintained as an emergency source. The dam and gatehouse were listed on the National Register of Historic Places in 1990.

== See also ==
- Framingham Reservoir No. 1 Dam and Gatehouse
- Framingham Reservoir No. 2 Dam and Gatehouse
- Sudbury Aqueduct
- National Register of Historic Places listings in Framingham, Massachusetts
