= List of places of worship in Framingham, Massachusetts =

Framingham, Massachusetts
- City
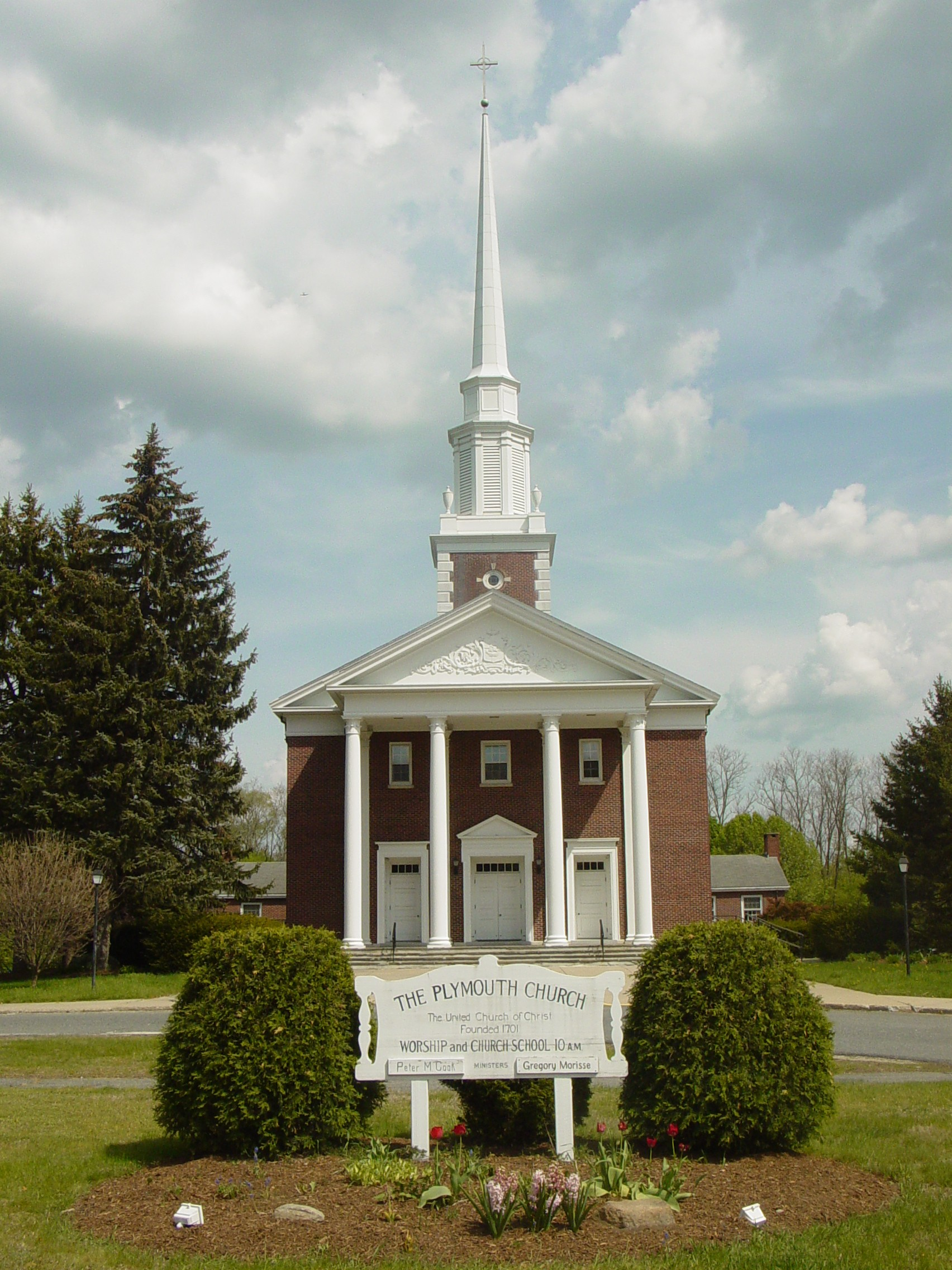
- Plymouth Church in Framingham Center

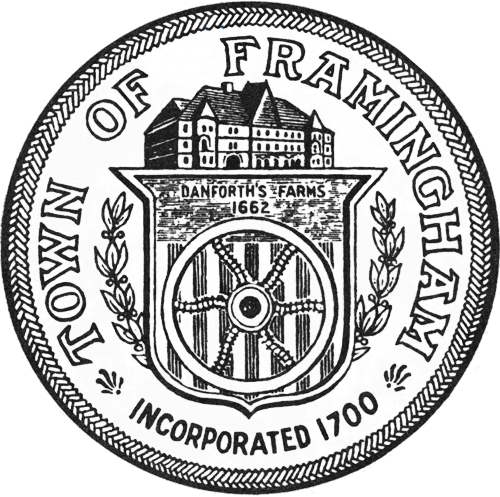
- Seal

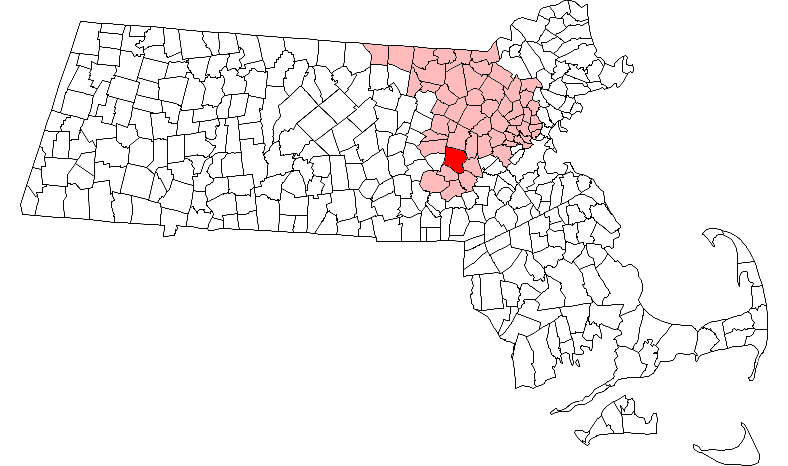
- Location in Massachusetts
- Coordinates: 42°16′45″N 71°25′00″W
- Country: United States
- State: Massachusetts
- County: Middlesex County
- Settled: 1650
- Incorporated: 1700

Government
  - Type: Mayor-council government

Area
  - Total: 26.4 sq mi (68.5 km^{2})
  - Land: 25.1 sq mi (65.1 km^{2})
  - Water: 1.3 sq mi (3.4 km^{2})
- Elevation: 160 ft (50 m)

Population (2000)
  - Total: 66,910
  - Density: 2,664/sq mi (1,028.4/km^{2})
- Time zone: UTC-5 (Eastern)
  - Summer (DST): UTC-4 (Eastern)
- ZIP code: 01701, 01702, 01703, 01704, 01705
- Area code: 508 / 774
- Website: www.framinghamma.gov

This is a list of places of worship in the city of Framingham, Massachusetts. All institutions are listed in alphabetical order by faith, denomination and facility.

== Christian ==
=== Baptist ===
- Bible Baptist Church
- Brazilian Baptist Church
- First Baptist Church
- New Bethel Baptist Church
- New Jerusalem Baptist Church
- South Middlesex Baptist Church
- Temple Baptist Church
- Zion MetroWest Church

=== Catholic ===
- Marist House Retreat
- St. Bridget's Church
- St. George's Church
- St. Jeremiah's Church
- St. Stephen's Church
- St. Tarcisius' Church

=== Christian Science ===
- First Church of Christ, Scientist

=== Episcopal ===
- St. Andrew's Episcopal Church

=== Interdenominational ===
- Greater Framingham Community Church

=== Jehovah's Witness ===
- Framingham Spanish Congregation of Jehovah's Witness

=== Lutheran ===
- Lutheran Church of Framingham

=== Methodist ===
- First Methodist Of Saxonville
- First United Methodist Church
- Wesley United Methodist Church

=== Non-denominational ===
- Crossroads Community Church
- Haven of Hope

=== Orthodox Christian ===
- Albanian Orthodox Church of the Annunciation
- Armenian Church of Metro West
- Holy Translators Armenian Church
- Parish of St John of Shanghai and San Francisco the Miracle Worker (Russian Orthodox)

=== Presbyterian (PCA) ===
- New Life Presbyterian church

=== Quaker ===
- Friends Meeting House

=== Reformed Church in America (RCA) ===
- Boston Taiwanese Christian Church

=== Seventh-day Adventist Church ===
- Framingham Portuguese Seventh-day Adventist Church
- Framingham Spanish Seventh-day Adventist Church
- Seventh-day Adventist Church

=== United Church of Christ ===
- Edwards Church
- Grace Congregational
- Pilgrim Meeting Center
- Plymouth Church

=== Other ===
First Parish in Framingham, Unitarian Universalist

- Assembly Of Christian Churches Of Framingham
- Beacon Community Church
- Brazilian Community Christian Church
- Church of the Nazarene
- Community Church
- Cornerstone Community Church
- Ebenezer Christian Church
- Elim Framingham Massachusetts - Located at 25 Loring Dr Framingham Massachusetts. Headquartered in San Salvador El Salvador. Born on October 3, 2014, at 125 Irving Street.
- First Assembly of God - Originally known as "Pentecostal Church of Framingham", incorporated in 1922. Originally located at Hartford and C Streets, the church purchased the former United Auto Workers union hall located at 32 South Street in downtown Framingham in 1994. The (former) Assemblies of God New England District and a Bible School were located on Route 9 in Framingham Center until their sale in 1957. First Assembly of God of Framingham is affiliated with the General Council of the Assemblies of God in the United States of America, headquartered in Springfield, Missouri, and the Southern New England District of the Assemblies of God, located in Charlton, Massachusetts.
- First Church
- First Parish in Framingham (Unitarian Universalist)
- Framingham Christ Reformed Church
- Framingham Church of God in Christ
- Getzemani Defend of Christ
- Grace Evangelical Free Church of Framingham
- Our Lady of Fatima Church
- Salvation Army - maintains a presence in Framingham's downtown by not only offering religious services, but also to care for Framingham's homeless population
- Sons of Mary Missionary Society
- Southern New Eng Conf Assoc Seventh Day Adventists
- Waves Of Revival Church

== Islamic ==
- Masjid-Basheer - part of the Islamic Society of Framingham

== Jewish ==
- Chabad-Lubavitch of Framingham
- Congregation Bais Chabad
- Temple Beth Am (Reform)
- Temple Beth Sholom (Conservative)
