= Framingham Centre Common Historic District =

Historic district in Massachusetts, United States

- U.S. National Register of Historic Places
- U.S. Historic district
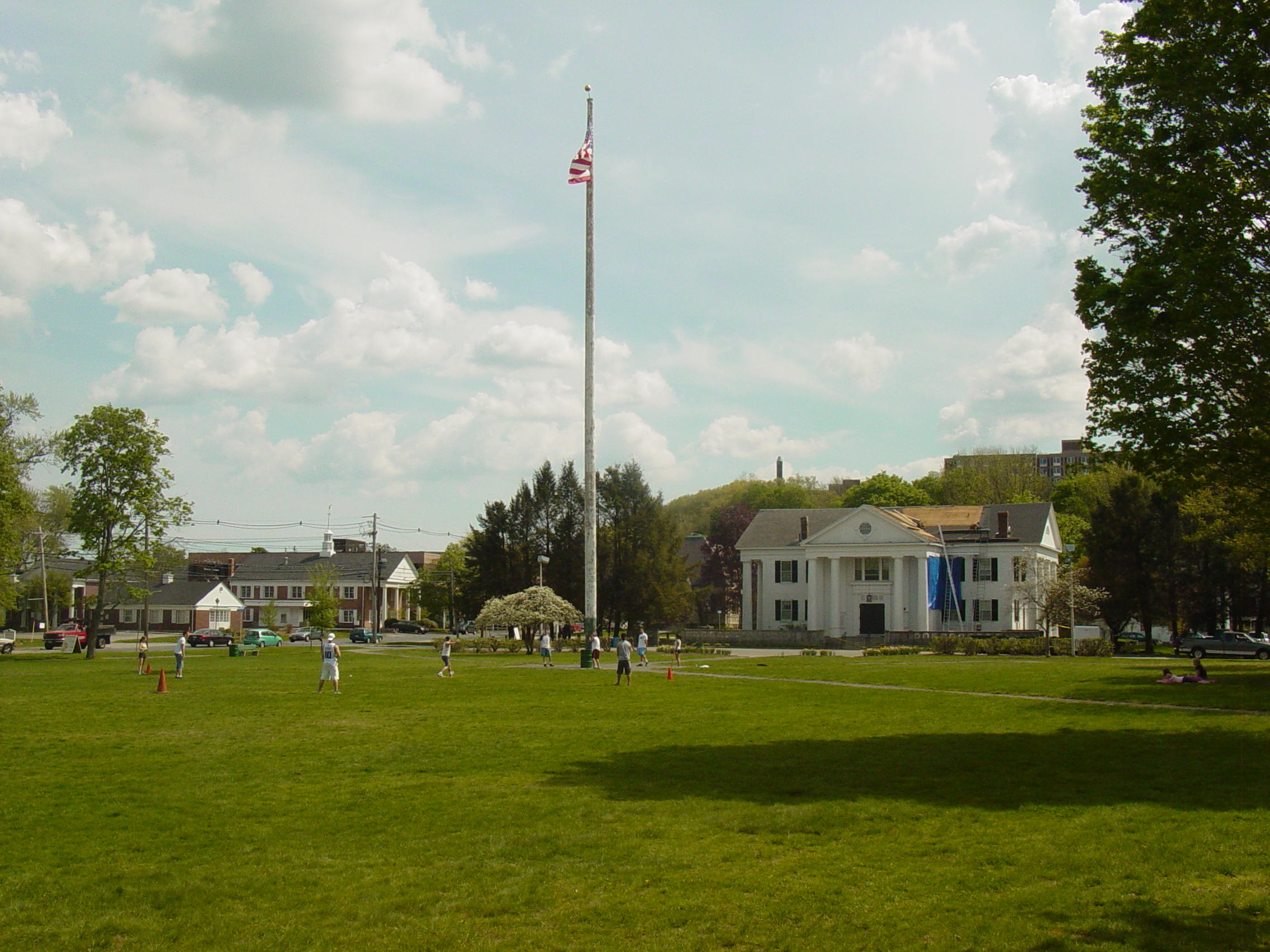

- Location within Massachusetts Location within the United States
- Location: Framingham, Massachusetts
- Coordinates: 42°18′13″N 71°26′8″W
- Architect: Willard, Solomon; Et al.
- Architectural style: Greek Revival, Italianate, Federal
- NRHP reference No.: 90001564
- Added to NRHP: October 25, 1990

The Framingham Centre Common Historic District encompasses the historic early center of Framingham, Massachusetts. It is centered on the old town common, which is west of Edgell Road, a short way north of the busy commercial corridor of Massachusetts Route 9. The district includes 28 buildings, among them important early civic structures such as the Village Hall, old Edgell Memorial Library, First Parish Church, and the former Framingham Academy building.

The district was listed on the National Register of Historic Places in 1990.

== See also ==
- National Register of Historic Places listings in Framingham, Massachusetts
