= Concord Square Historic District =

Historic district in Massachusetts, United States

- U.S. National Register of Historic Places
- U.S. Historic district
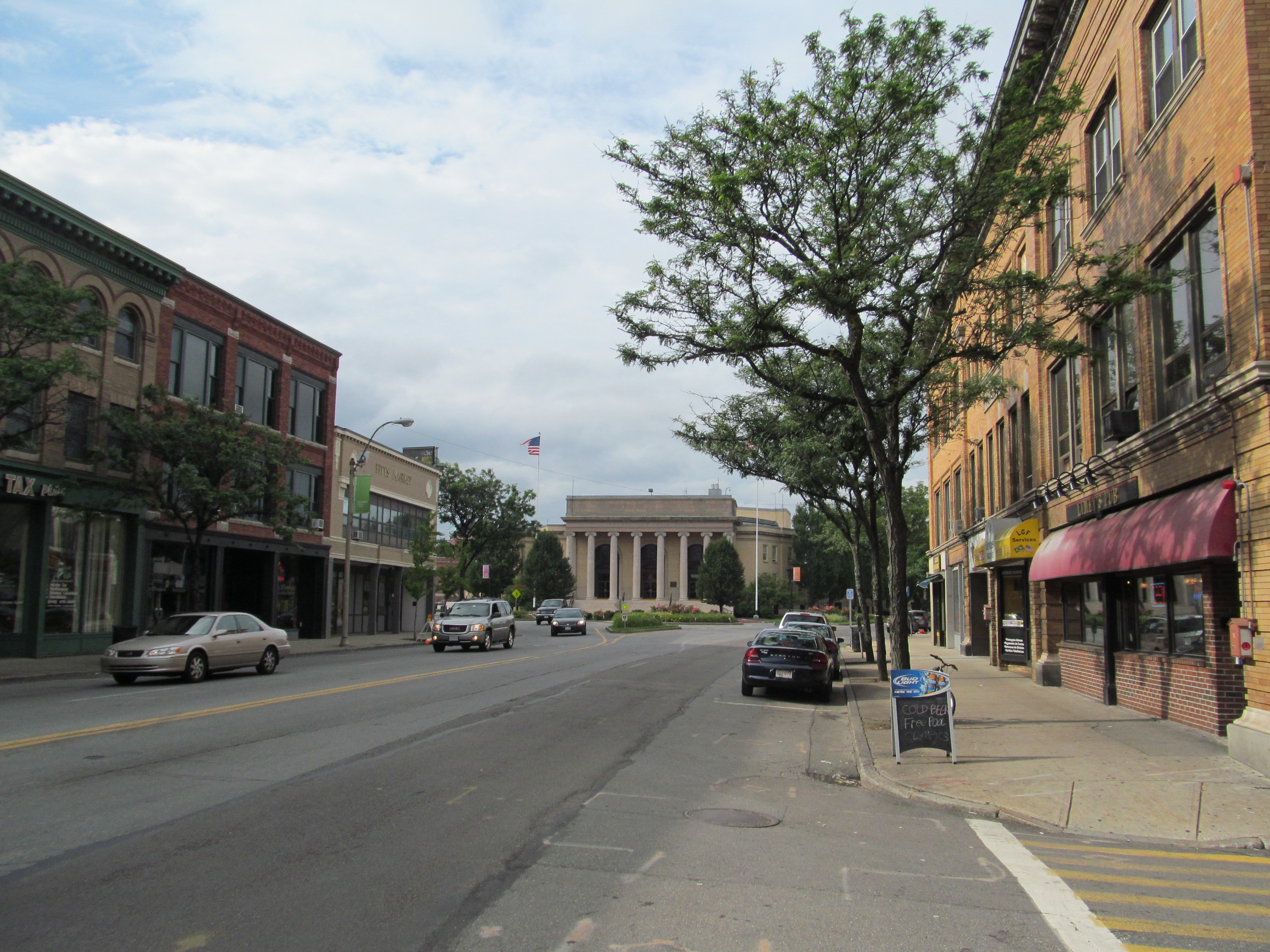
- Concord Square

- Location within Massachusetts Location within the United States
- Location: Framingham, Massachusetts
- Coordinates: 42°16′42″N 71°25′6″W
- Built: 1855
- Architect: Esty, Alexander Rice; Multiple
- Architectural style: Classical Revival
- NRHP reference No.: 83000794
- Added to NRHP: March 10, 1983

The Concord Square Historic District is a historic district on Park, Concord, and Kendall Streets, and Union Avenue in Framingham, Massachusetts. It encompasses a portion of the town's central business district, extending from the junction of Concord and Union Streets south to the South Framingham Common, and then west along Park Street. Most of the buildings in this area were built between 1890 and 1920. The oldest building is the Wallace Nutting Factory at 46 Park Street, built in the early 1870s. The district was added to the National Register of Historic Places in 1983.

== See also ==
- Irving Square Historic District, just to the south
- National Register of Historic Places listings in Framingham, Massachusetts
