= Learned (disambiguation) =

To be learned is to have much learning.

Learned may also refer to:

- Learned (surname), an American surname
- Learned Hand (1872–1961), an American judge and judicial philosopher
- Learned, Mississippi, a town in the United States
- Learned Pond, a body of water in Framingham, Massachusetts, United States

== See also ==
- List of people known as the Learned
