= Tristram Seidler =

Tristram G. Seidler
- Education: University of California Santa Cruz (B. A.), Harvard University (Ph.D.)
- Scientific career
- Workplaces: New England Wild Flower Society, University of Massachusetts Amherst

Tristram G. Seidler is an American botanist, ecologist and professor at University of Massachusetts Amherst. His work includes studying sampling biases in herbarium collections, seed dispersal patterns, and curating plant and plant cell culture collections for use in research.
