= Michael P. O'Leary =

American urologist

- Born: 1952 (age 73–74); Framingham, Massachusetts
- Education: Harvard College; George Washington University School of Medicine
- Known for: Male sexual health; President of the Boston Athletic Association (2017-2023)
- Medical career
- Profession: Surgeon
- Field: Urology
- Institutions: Brigham and Women's Hospital, Boston, Massachusetts; Harvard Medical School
- Sub-specialties: Male infertility, erectile dysfunction, benign prostate disease, stone disease
- Research: Male sexual dysfunction; Lower urinary tract symptoms

Michael P. O'Leary (born 1952) is an American urologist at Brigham and Women's Hospital in Boston, Massachusetts, professor of surgery at Harvard Medical School, and a former president and chair of the Boston Athletic Association. His work focuses on benign prostate disease, stone disease, male infertility and sexual dysfunction in men.

O'Leary's work has included developing patient-reported outcomes; a tool for measuring male sexual function, and for being named for a scale that measures lower urinary tract symptoms and their impact in people with interstitial cystitis.

== Early life and education ==
Michael Philip O'Leary was born in Framingham, Massachusetts, to a lifelong Boston Athletic Association (BAA) member, who was also a former physician of Walter Brown. He completed his early education from Harvard College, where he was a track and cross country runner. In 1978 he gained admission to the George Washington University School of Medicine, from where he graduated in 1980 and also received a master's degree in Public Health from Harvard the same year Between 1980 and 1982 he was resident at Tufts University School of Medicine, and then at Massachusetts General Hospital until 1987. He received his board certificate in urology in 1990, after completing a fellowship at the University of California, San Francisco, School of Medicine and Stanford University School of Medicine the previous year.

== Boston Athletic Association ==
In 1989 O'Leary joined the BAA, that runs the annual Boston Marathon. In 2013, he was at the finish line of the Boston Marathon bombing. He was elected the BAA's president and chair of the Board of Governors in 2017 for a six-year term, having succeeded the BAA's first female president Joann Flaminio. In 2023 his position as chair of the board of governors was succeeded by paralympic medallist Cheri Blauwet.

== Male sexual dysfunction ==
O'Leary and colleagues developed the American Urologic Assoc Symptom Score for benign prostatic hyperplasia, also known as the International Prostate Symptom Score or IPSS. He is the principal author of the "Brief Male Sexual Function Inventory"; one patient-reported outcome tool used for measuring male sexual function. The questionnaire includes 11 items covering five parts; sexual desire, ejaculation, erection, perception of sexual function, and satisfaction with sex. He is also a medical editor for the Harvard health report titled "What to Do about Erectile Dysfunction". In it, he wrote that erections "serve as a barometer", and problems with erections may indicate problems with the heart and blood vessels. This he notes may be prevented by simple lifestyle changes like losing weight, exercising, and stopping smoking. The study was one of many that associate the ability to form an erection with cardiovascular health.

== Interstitial Cystitis ==
O'Leary is named for the O'Leary-Sant Interstitial Cystitis Symptom Index, for measuring lower urinary tract symptoms and their impact in people with interstitial cystitis. It looks at four main symptoms of interstitial cystitis and bladder pain syndrome; bladder pain, urgency, and frequency.

== Personal and family ==
O'Leary is married to Kathleen J. Welch, a retired anesthesiologist at Brigham and Women's Hospital. They live in Dedham, Massachusetts, and have two children, Jacqueline, a marketing director for Dunkin' Donuts, and James, a physician in vascular surgery at Boston's Beth Israel Deaconess Medical Center.

== Selected publications ==
- Barry, M. J.; Fowler, F. J.; O'Leary, M. P.; Bruskewitz, R. C.; Holtgrewe, H. L.; Mebust, W. K.; Cockett, A. T. (November 1992). "The American Urological Association symptom index for benign prostatic hyperplasia. The Measurement Committee of the American Urological Association". The Journal of Urology. 148 (5): 1549–1557, discussion 1564. doi:10.1016/s0022-5347(17)36966-5. ISSN 0022-5347. PMID 1279218.
- O'Leary, M. P.; Fowler, F. J.; Lenderking, W. R.; Barber, B.; Sagnier, P. P.; Guess, H. A.; Barry, M. J. (November 1995). "A brief male sexual function inventory for urology". Urology. 46 (5): 697–706. doi:10.1016/S0090-4295(99)80304-5. ISSN 0090-4295. PMID 7495124.
- O'Leary, Michael P.; Sant, Grannum R.; Fowler, Floyd J.; Whitmore, Kristine E.; Spolarich-Kroll, Judy (1 May 1997). "The interstitial cystitis symptom index and problem index". Urology. 49 (5, Supplement 1): 58–63. doi:10.1016/S0090-4295(99)80333-1. ISSN 0090-4295. PMID 9146003.
- Schaeffer, Anthony J.; Knauss, Jill S.; Landis, J. Richard; Propert, Kathleen J.; Alexander, Richard B.; Litwin, Mark S.; Nickel, J. Curtis; O'Leary, Michael P.; Nadler, Robert B.; Pontari, Michel A.; Shoskes, Daniel A.; Zeitlin, Scott I.; Fowler, Jackson E.; Mazurick, Carissa A.; Kusek, John W.; Nyberg, Leroy M. (September 2002). "Leukocyte and bacterial counts do not correlate with severity of symptoms in men with chronic prostatitis: the National Institutes of Health Chronic Prostatitis Cohort Study". The Journal of Urology. 168 (3): 1048–1053. doi:10.1016/S0022-5347(05)64572-7. ISSN 0022-5347. PMID 12187220.
- Rosen, Raymond; Altwein, Jens; Boyle, Peter; Kirby, Roger S.; Lukacs, B.; Meuleman, Eric; O'Leary, Michael P.; Puppo, Paolo; Robertson, Chris; Giuliano, Francois (December 2003). "Lower urinary tract symptoms and male sexual dysfunction: the multinational survey of the aging male (MSAM-7)". European Urology. 44 (6): 637–649. doi:10.1016/j.eururo.2003.08.015. ISSN 0302-2838. PMID 14644114.
- Dallal, Ramsey M.; Chernoff, Arthur; O'Leary, Michael P.; Smith, Jason A.; Braverman, Justin D.; Quebbemann, Brian B. (December 2008). "Sexual dysfunction is common in the morbidly obese male and improves after gastric bypass surgery". Journal of the American College of Surgeons. 207 (6): 859–864. doi:10.1016/j.jamcollsurg.2008.08.006. ISSN 1879-1190. PMID 19183532.
