= Esther A. Hopkins =

African–American chemist and environmental attorney (1926–2021)

Esther A.H. Hopkins
- Born: Esther Arvilla Harrison; September 18, 1926; Stamford, Connecticut
- Died: May 19, 2021 (aged 94); Martha’s Vineyard, Massachusetts
- Education: Boston University (B.A., 1947); Howard University (M.S., 1949); Yale University (M.S., 1962; Ph.D, 1967); Suffolk University (J.D., 1976)
- Occupations: Chemist, Lawyer
- Spouses: John Mitchell (m. 1955, divorced); T. Ewell Hopkins (m. 1959; died 2001)
- Children: Susan Mitchell; T. Ewell Hopkins, Jr.
- Scientific career
- Fields: Chemistry
- Thesis: Catalysis of phosphoryl group transfer by metal ions (1967)
- Doctoral advisor: Jui Hsin Wang

Esther Arvilla Hopkins (née Harrison; September 18, 1926 – May 19, 2021) was an American chemist, environmental attorney and politician. Hopkins was best known for her career as a biophysicist and research chemist at American Cyanamid along with research in the Polaroid Corp Emulsion Coating and Analysis Laboratory, becoming a Fellow of the American Chemical Society in 2011. She also pursued a career working as an attorney with the Massachusetts Department of Environmental Protection (DEP), then becoming the first African-American woman elected to office in Framingham, Massachusetts.

== Early life and family ==
Esther Arvilla Harrison was born on September 18, 1926, in Stamford, Connecticut, to Esther Small and George Burgess Harrison. Her mother migrated from Society Hill, South Carolina, to New Rochelle, New York, at the age of 12 (1901) to move north and work as a maid for a New Rochelle family. Small was the first member of her family fully freed from slavery. She was also the first member of her family to graduate from high school and to own a home. While working as a chauffeur in Stamford, Connecticut, she married George Burgess Harrison, who was also employed as a chauffeur. George was raised in East Orange, New Jersey, where he attended high school, but dropped out to work as a janitor and chauffeur. Esther Harrison was born in 1926 and along with two brothers, one older and one younger. The Harrison family battled poverty, but Esther spent most of her time at the public library and the Stamford theater. Her parents also provided her with piano lessons even when facing financial adversity. Throughout middle and high school, Esther played the piano at her church and was president of the Young Women's Christian Association (YWCA).

== Education ==
Esther began kindergarten at the age of 3, passing an early enrollment test to enter school. She succeeded in the classroom, especially in the subjects of math and chemistry. She attended Hart Elementary School and Burdick Junior High School, both in her hometown of Stamford. Upon graduating 21st in her class from Stamford High School in 1943, Esther Harrison had her sights set on attending medical school and becoming a doctor. Despite being told to consider a career as a hairdresser, by a neighbor at the local YWCA, Esther had her mind set on medicine. After graduating from high school, Harrison had sights set on attending Yale University, although the school was not coed in 1943. She graduated from Boston University in 1947 with a B.A. in chemistry. She was rejected from Boston University's medical school due to the limited availability of two seats for African American students. Alternatively, she attended Howard University where she received her master's degree in organic chemistry in 1949. She later earned a second master's degree (1962) and Ph.D. (1967) in chemistry at Yale University, while carrying out chemical research for American Cyanamid. Her dissertation research focused on the effects of the release of adenosine diphosphate (ADP) in fireflies.

== Career ==
After graduating from Howard University, Esther Hopkins began teaching chemistry at Virginia State College from 1949 to 1952 before deciding to pursue research. She was offered a position to work with the New England Institute for Medical Research in 1955, where she was an assistant researcher in biophysics until 1959. After this research stint, she worked as a chemist at the American Cyanamid's research lab back at home in Stamford. She earned both her second M.S. and Ph.D. in chemistry from Yale while working at American Cyanamid as a research chemist. Upon completion of her Ph.D. program, Hopkins was hired as a supervisory research chemist with the Polaroid Corporation in Cambridge, Massachusetts in 1967. There she led the Emulsion Coating and Analysis Laboratory, checking the chemical composition of film coating uniformity.

Hopkins attended the National Science Foundation's Double Blind Symposium in 1975, which was a conference that focused on the challenges that minorities, the disabled, and women face and illuminate the underrepresentation in STEM fields. This combined with personal experiences as an African-American female, sparked her interest in law and patent work. While working for Polaroid, she attended Suffolk University Law School where she received her J.D. degree with a concentration in patent law in 1976. Hopkins left her Polaroid lab in 1989 and began working as the deputy general counsel at the Massachusetts Department of Environmental Protection. She retired in 1999 from the Massachusetts DEP, but continued to work in her community, becoming the first ansd only African-American selectwoman elected to the local Framingham Board of Selectmen. While serving on the Board of Selectmen, she became the Board's first African-American chair. In 2011, she became a fellow of the American Chemical Society for her work at the Polaroid Corporation.

== Personal life ==
Esther married John Mitchell in 1955, who was pursuing a doctorate at Boston University when they met. They had a daughter named Susan who died in early adulthood due to diabetes complications. The marriage ended a few years later. Esther moved back to Stamford in 1959, where she met and married Rev. Thomas Ewell Hopkins in 1959, a local minister and social worker. Together they had one son, T. Ewell Hopkins Jr. Esther was married to T. Ewell for 42 years before his death in 2001. She resided with her son and daughter-in-law on Martha's Vineyard until her death.

== Awards and honors ==
- 1967 Yale University Phi Beta Kappa and Sigma Xi honor societies
- 1977 Boston University Scarley Key recipient
- Boston University Alpha Kappa Alpha sorority Golden Member
- 1979 Woman of the Year – Framingham Business & Professional Women's Club
- 1984 Woman of the Year – Framingham Regional Family YMCA
- 1999 First African-American Framingham Board of Selectmen
- 2011 American Chemical Society Fellow
- 2020 Unitarian Universalist Retired Ministers and Partners Association Creative Sageing Award
