= Callahan State Park =

Massachusetts state park

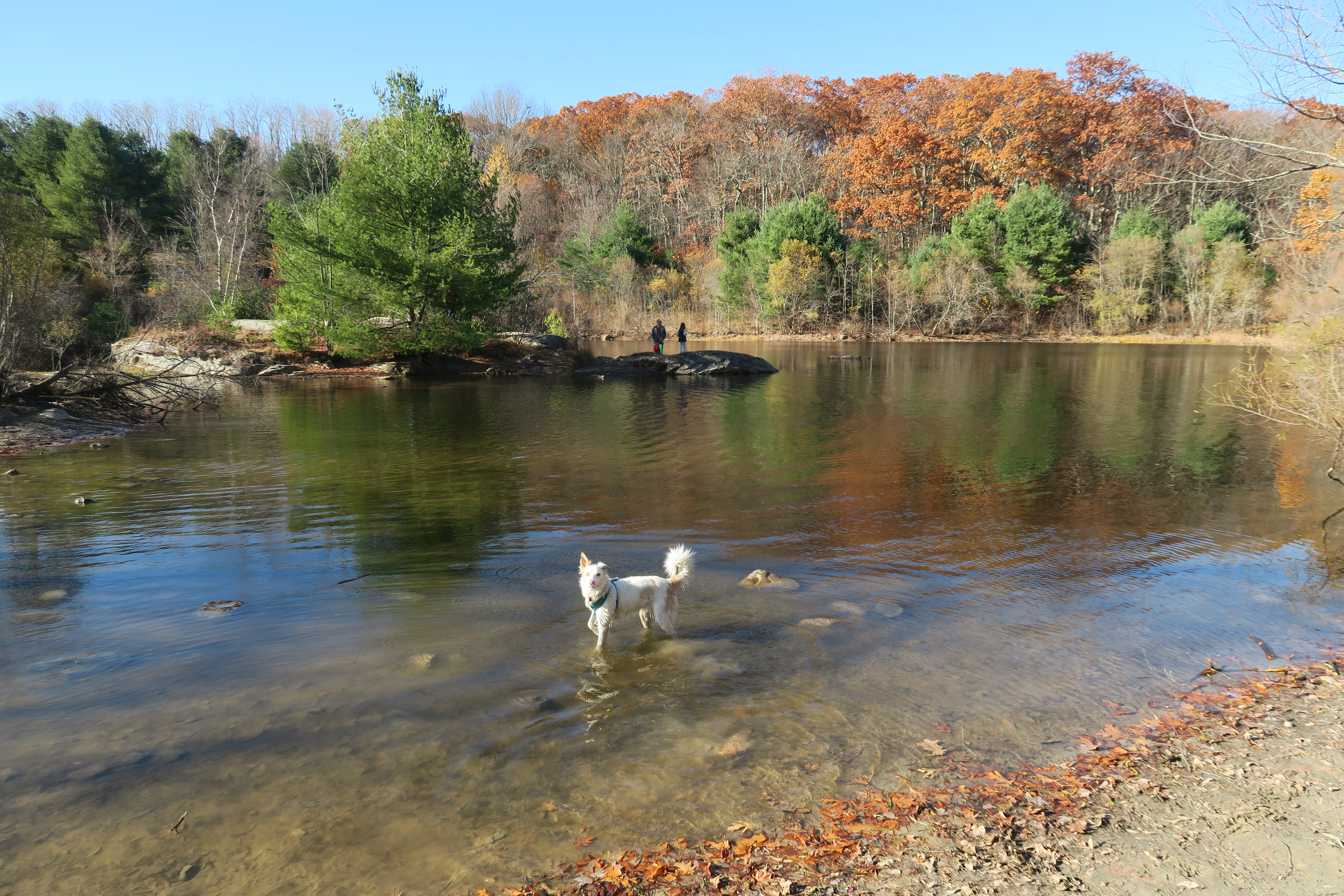
- Eagle Pond

- Location within Massachusetts Location within the United States
- Interactive map of Callahan State Park
- Location: Framingham and Marlborough, Massachusetts, United States
- Coordinates: 42°19′55″N 71°28′57″W
- Area: 958 acres (388 ha)
- Elevation: 509 ft (155 m)
- Established: 1970
- Administrator: Massachusetts Department of Conservation and Recreation
- Named for: Newspaperman Raymond J. Callahan
- Website: Official website

Callahan State Park is a public recreation area covering 958 acres (388 ha) mostly in Framingham and Marlborough, Massachusetts, with a small section in the adjoining town of Southborough. The state park is managed by the Department of Conservation and Recreation.

== History ==
The park opened with 435 acres in 1970. It was officially named in honor of local newspaperman Raymond J. Callahan by an act of the Massachusetts legislature in 1971.

== Flora and fauna ==
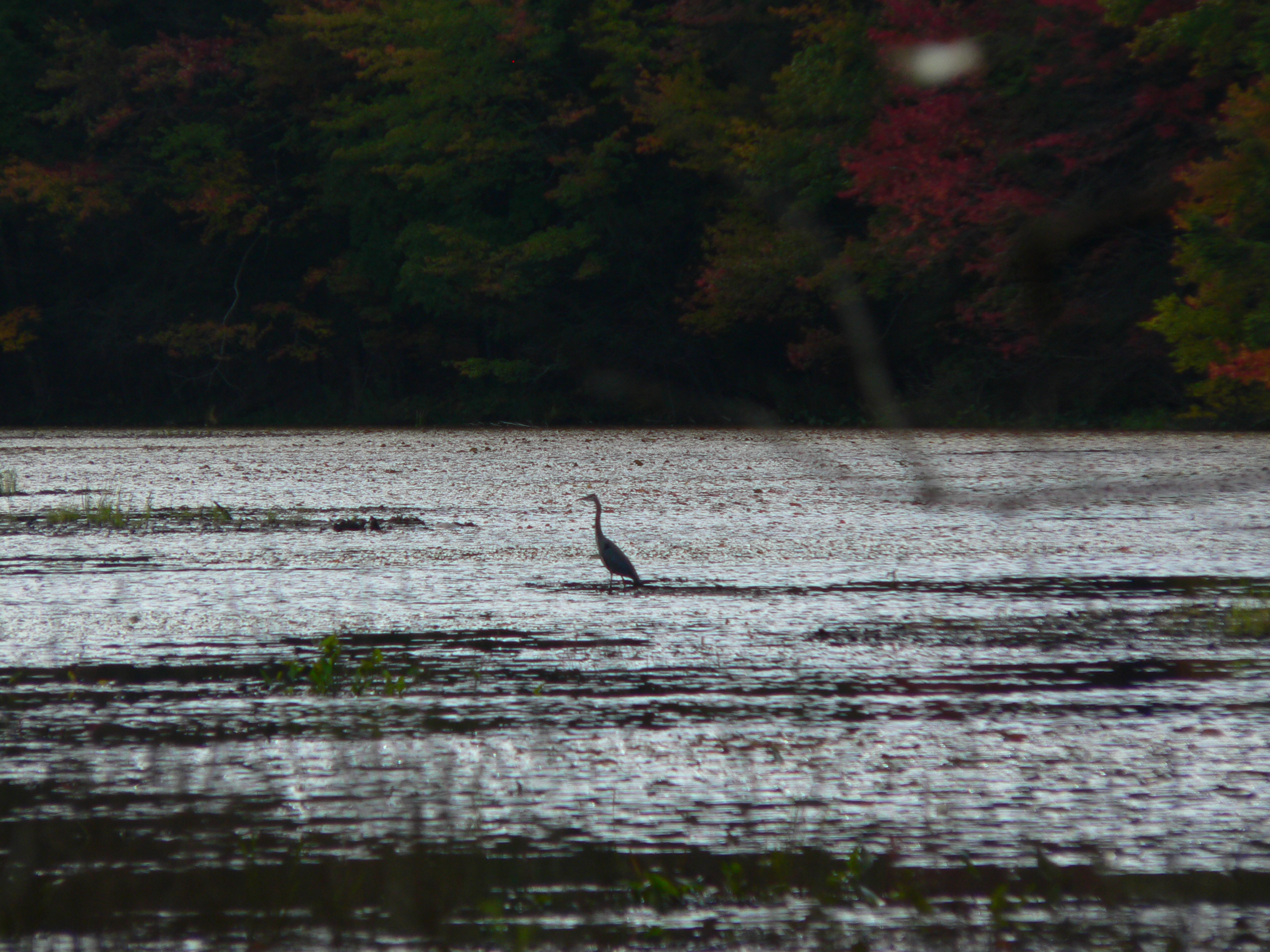
Callahan State Park, Framingham, Massachusetts

The park is home to a wide variety of trees both coniferous and deciduous. Wildlife include snapping turtles, spotted turtles, red bellied turtles, white tail deer, water snakes, tree frogs, most New England frog and toad varieties, minks, fisher cat, red fox, coyote, largemouth bass at Eagle Pond, various common trout, sunfish and blue gills, herons, egrets, bobolinks, goldfinches, orioles, red tail hawks, mocking birds, sparrows, swifts, swallows, grackles, cow birds, cat birds, barred owl, other various birds of prey, robins, cardinals, and blue jays. Deer flies, ticks, and mosquitoes are common. Garter snakes can be seen basking on dirt paths in spring and summer.

== Activities and amenities ==
The park has 7 miles (11 km) of trails for hiking, mountain biking, cross-country skiing, and horseback riding. Dog walking is a common activity. The Bay Circuit Trail crosses through the park. Parking areas are situated on Millwood Street, Edmands Road, and Broadmeadow Road.
