= Learned (surname) =

Learned is an American surname. Notable people with the surname include:

- Allan Learned (1906–1967), American football coach
- Amasa Learned (1750–1825), American politician
- Ebenezer Learned (1728–1801), American general
- Michael Learned (born 1939), American actress
