= Garden in the Woods =

Woodland botanical garden in Framingham, Massachusetts, United States

Coordinates: 42.34123°N 71.42645°W

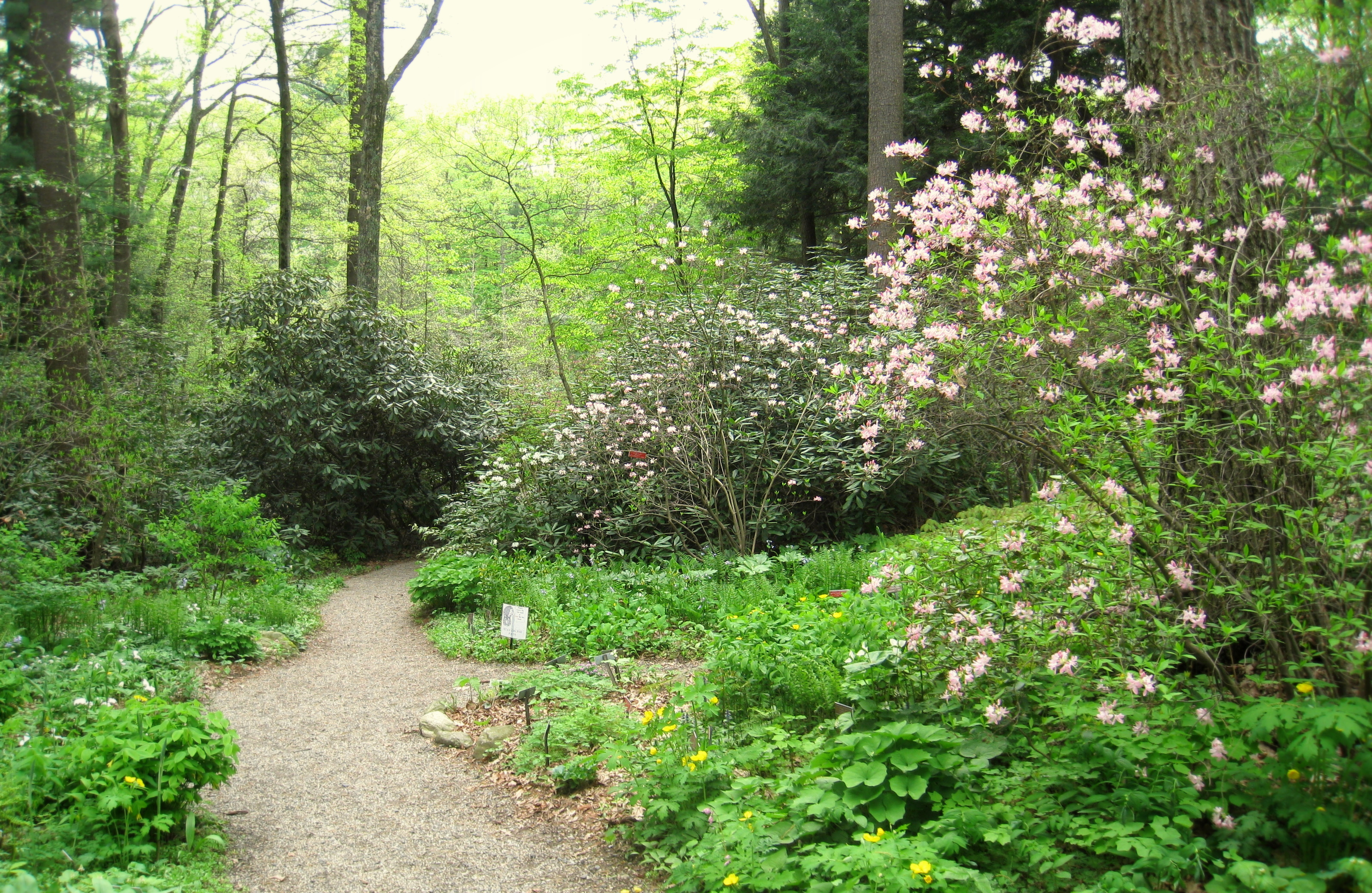
- A pathway in the garden.
- Interactive map of Garden in the Woods
- Website: Official website

Garden in the Woods is a 45 acres (180,000 m^{2}) woodland botanical garden located at 180 Hemenway Road, in Framingham, Massachusetts, United States. It is the headquarters of Native Plant Trust, and open to visitors between mid-April and November.

Garden in the Woods was founded in 1931, when Will C. Curtis purchased 30 acres (121,000 m^{2}) in North Framingham, and began to create a botanical garden on the site. When Curtis died in 1965, the land and gardens were deeded to the New England Wild Flower Society.

The Garden is the largest landscaped collection of wildflowers in New England, containing more than 1700 kinds of plants representing about 1000 species, including more than 200 rare and endangered native species, all within a mature oak forest on glacial terrain of rolling hills, ponds, and streams that provide a variety of microhabitats. Garden in the Woods also contains the largest retail native plant nursery in New England.

== Gallery ==
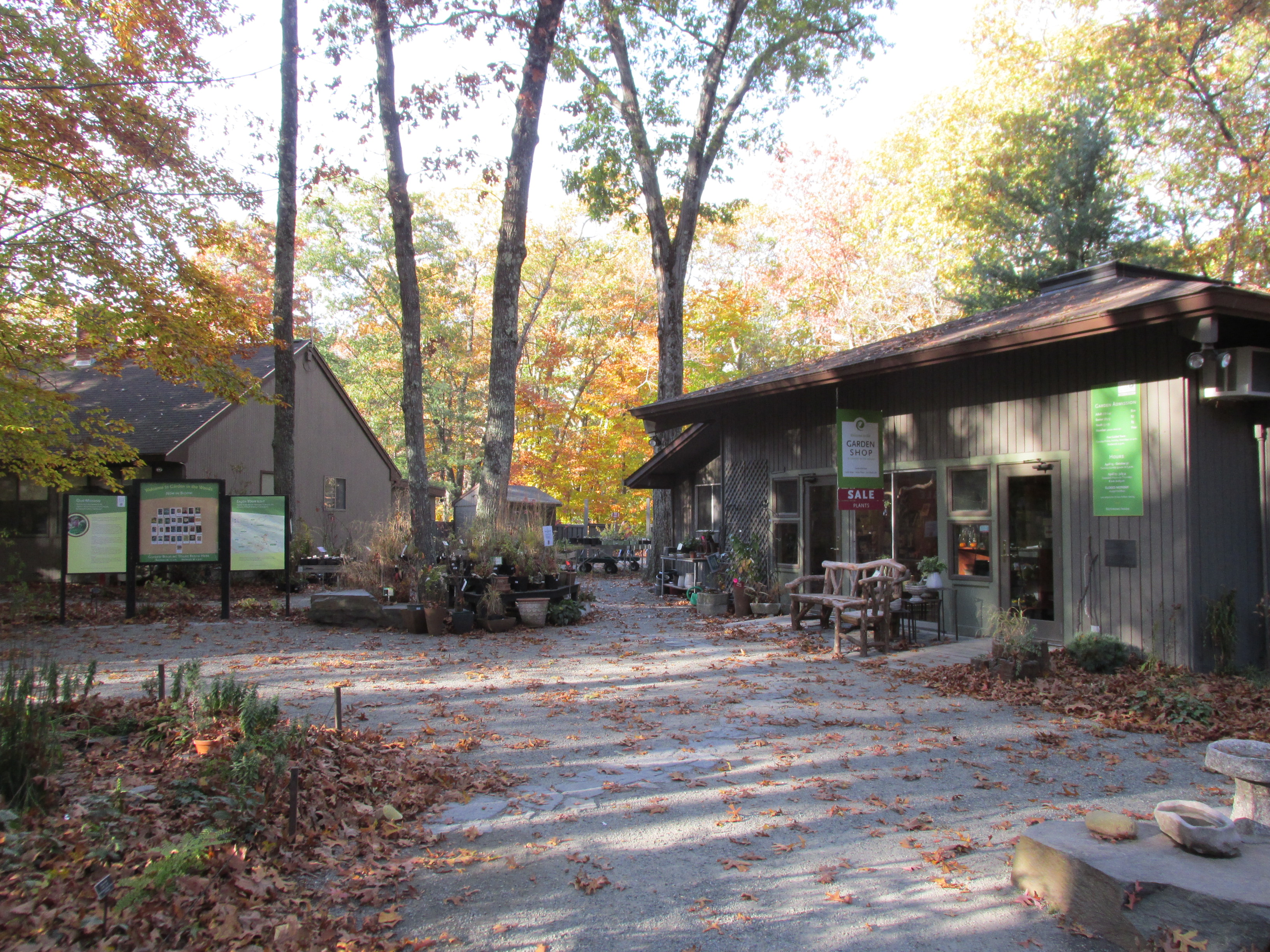
Garden shop.

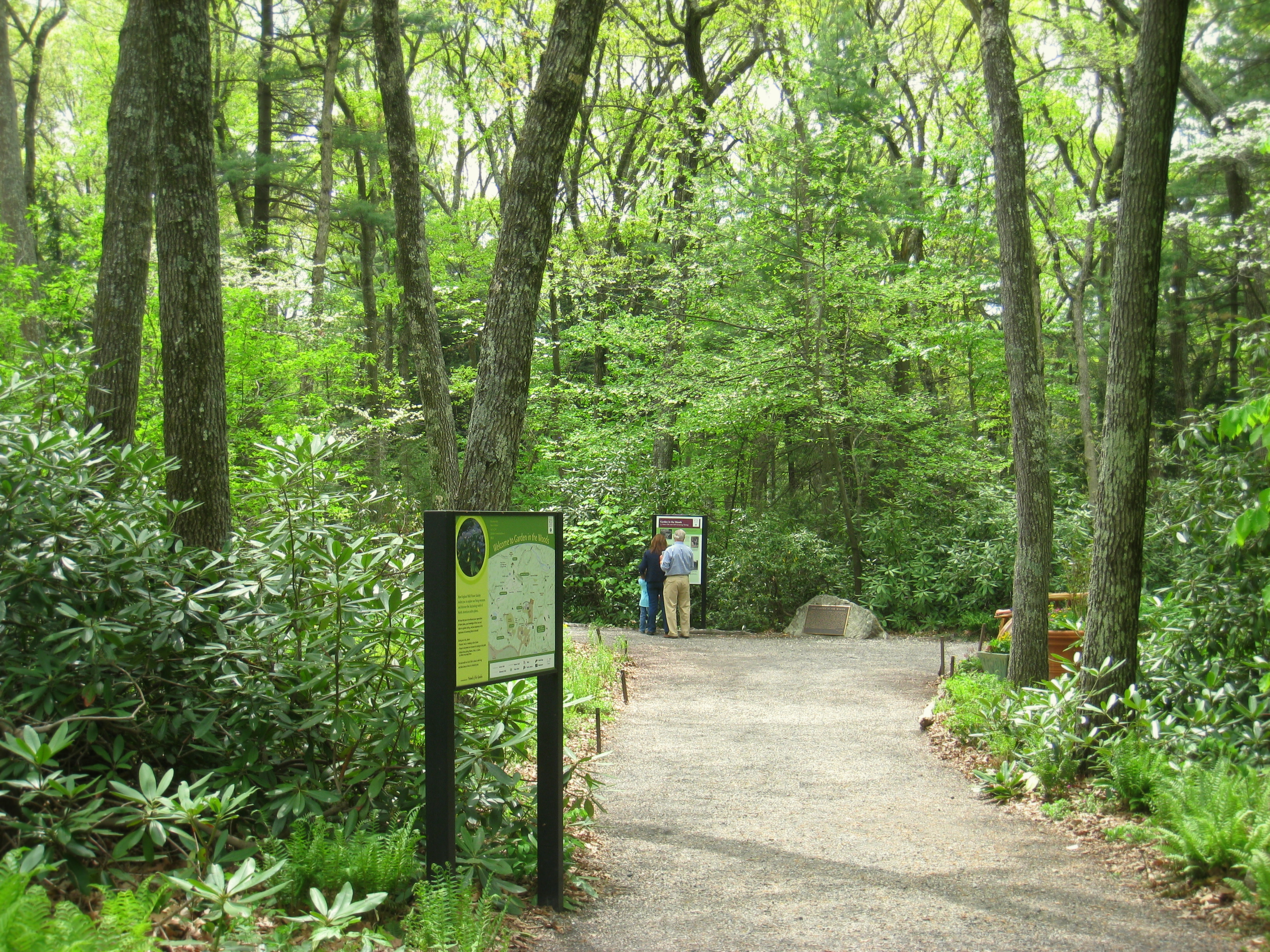
Information signs along a trail.

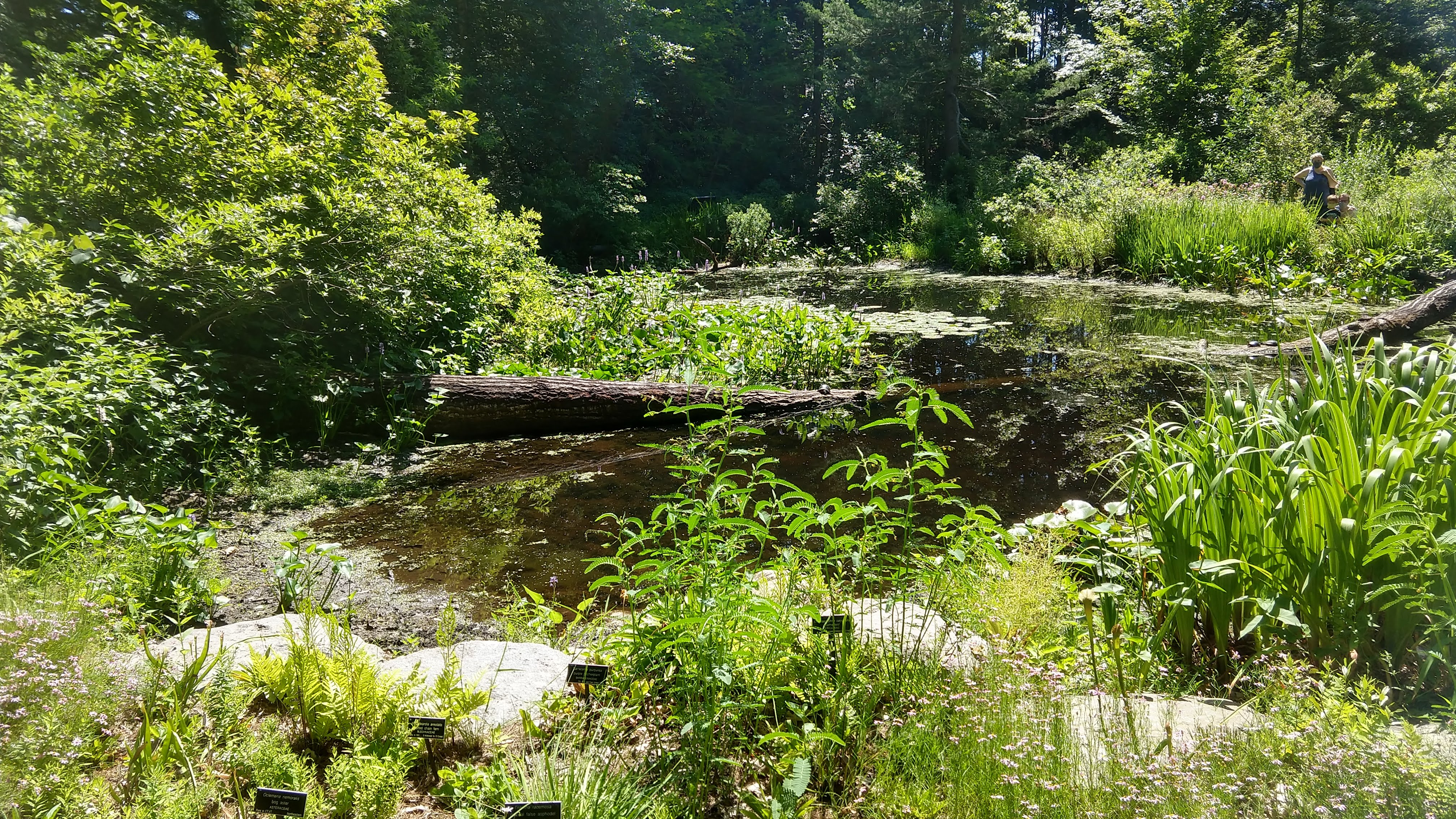
A pond in the garden.

== See also ==
- List of botanical gardens in the United States
- Wildflowers of New England
