= Framingham, Massachusetts =

City in the United States

Framingham
- City
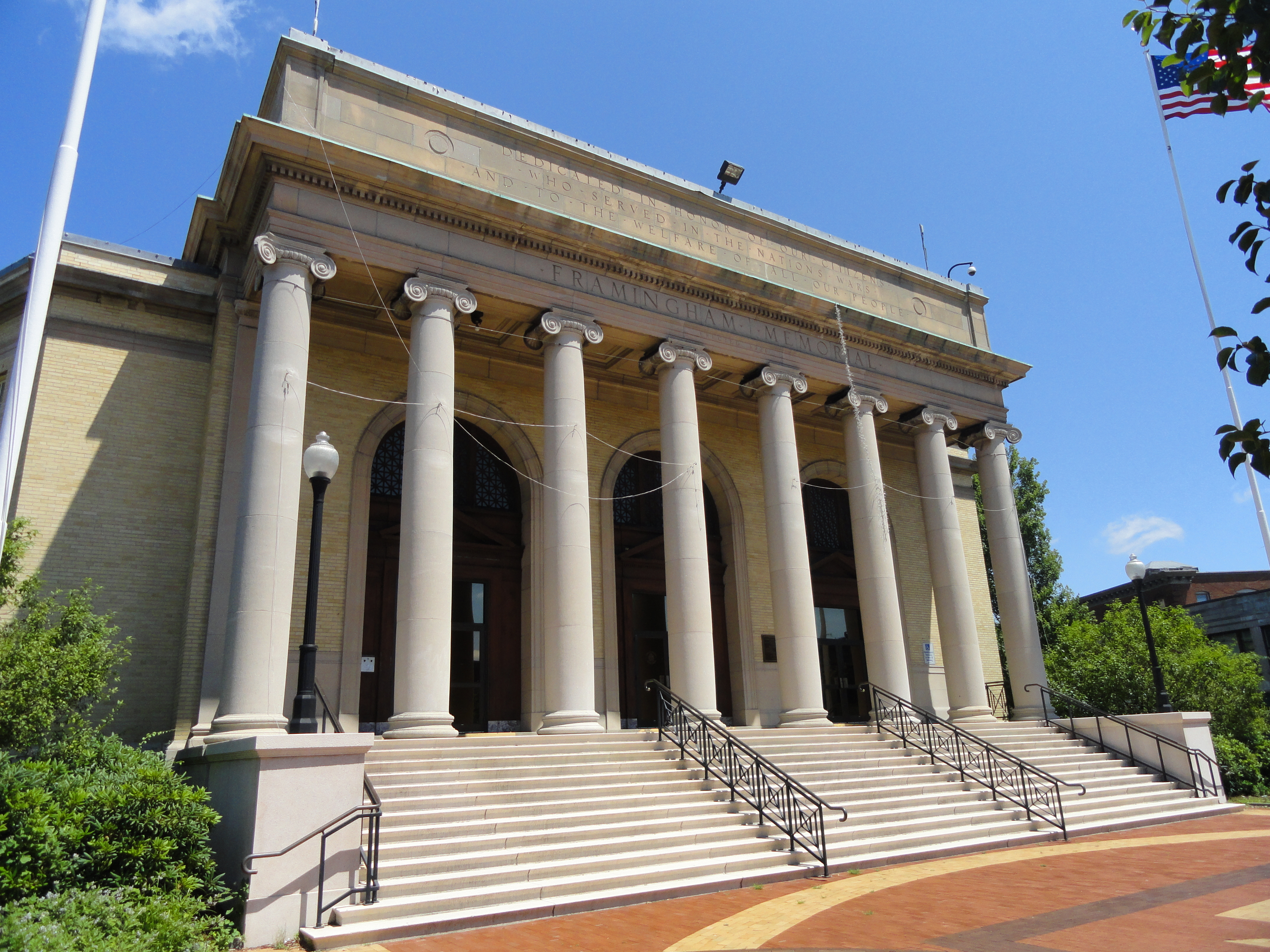
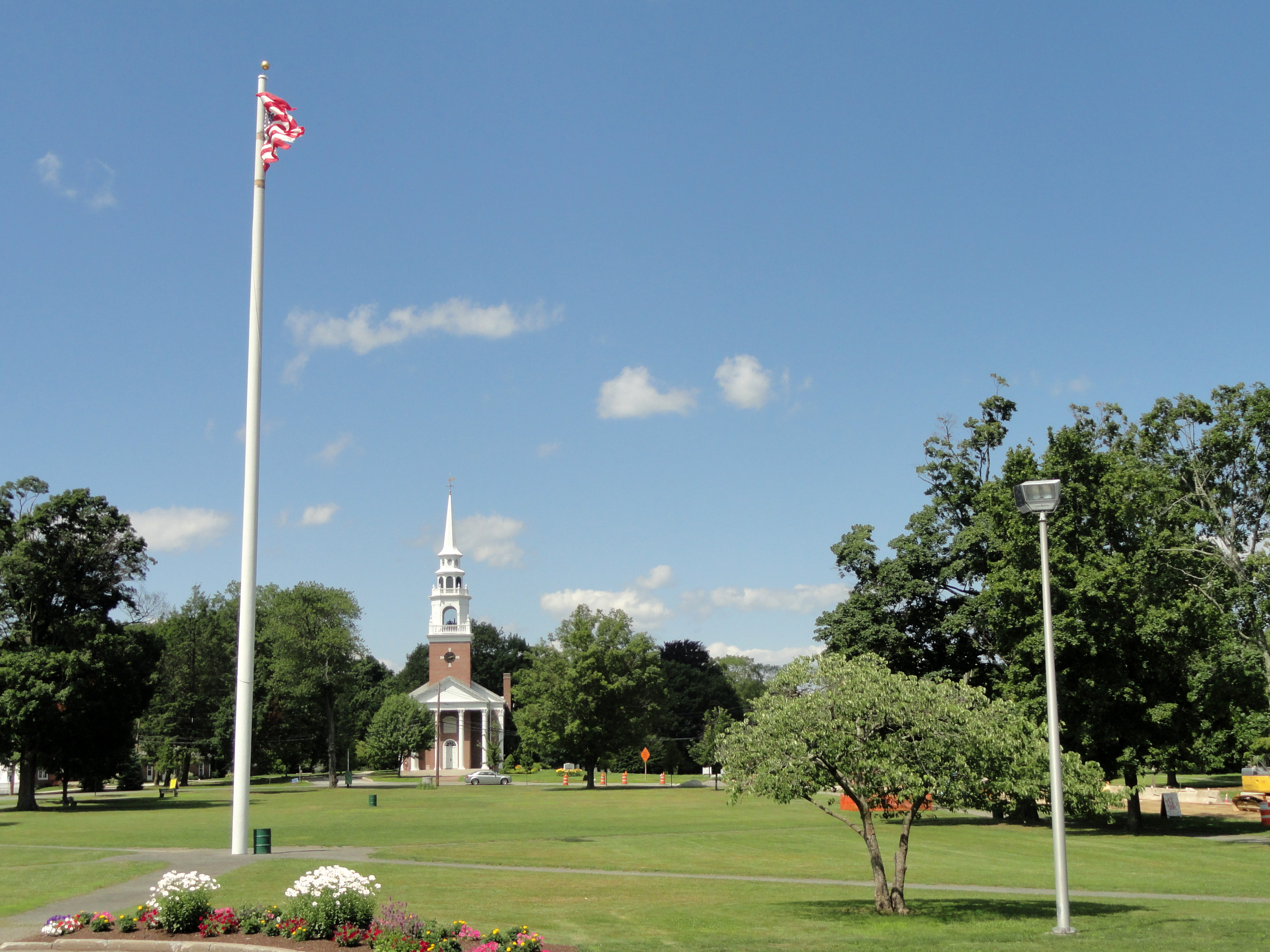
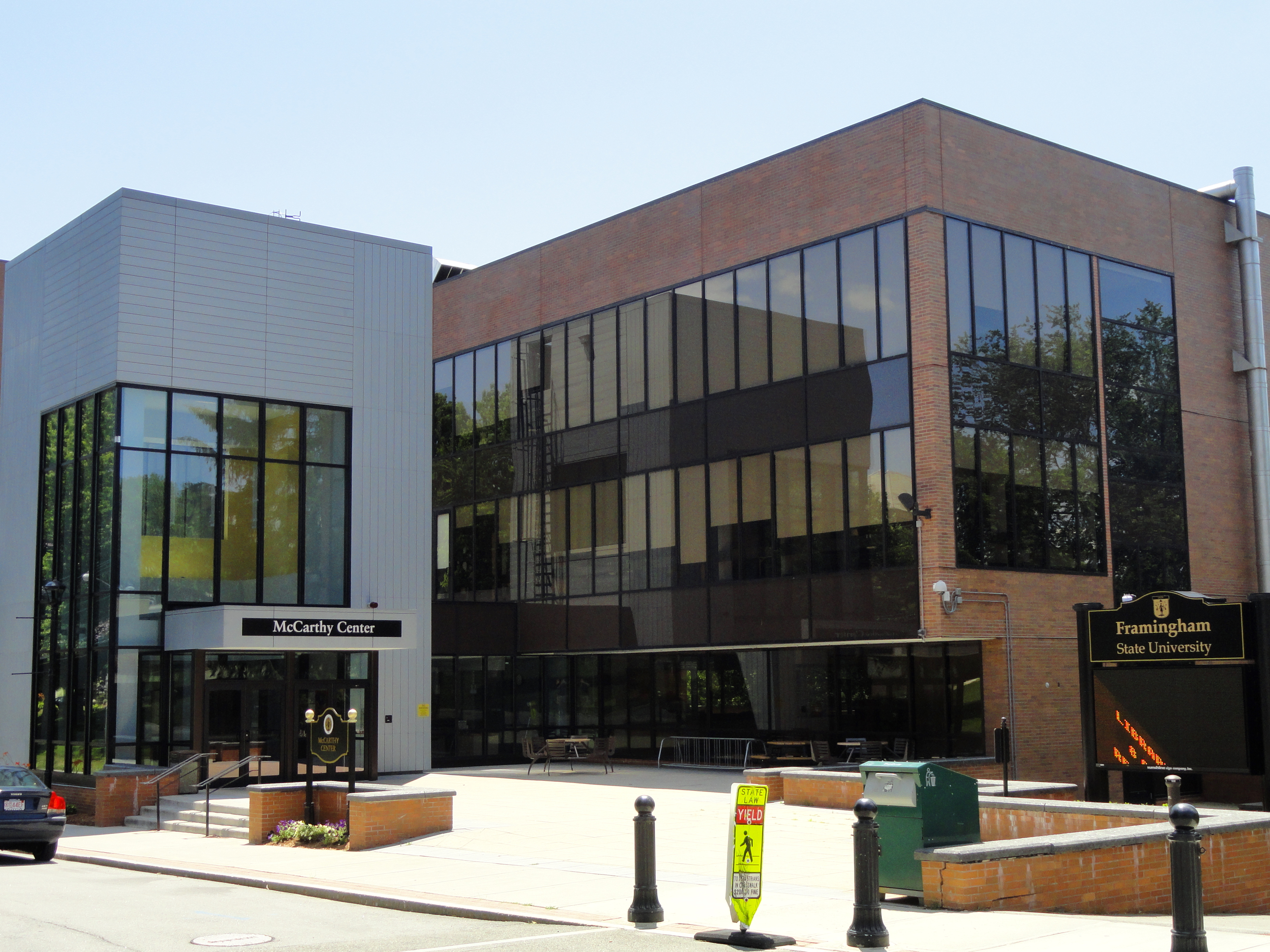
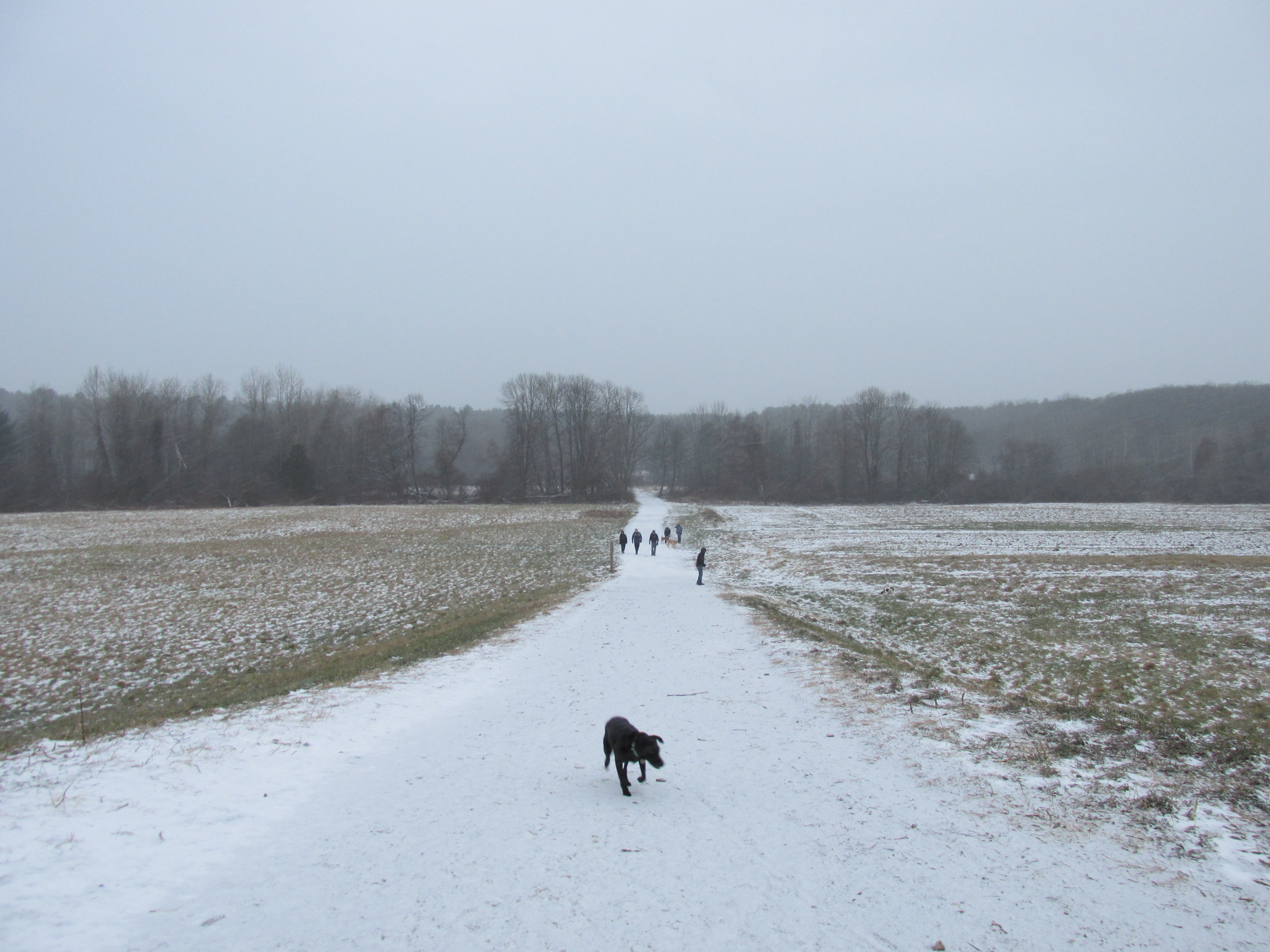
- Left-right from top: Memorial Hall in Concord Square Historic District, Framingham Common, Framingham State University, Callahan State Park

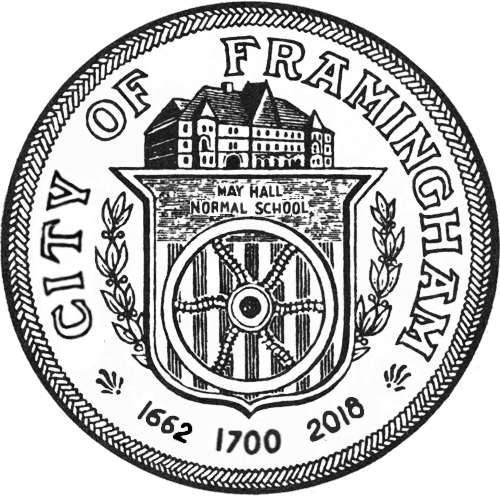
- Seal

- Location in Middlesex County in Massachusetts

- Location in Massachusetts Location in the United States
- Coordinates: 42°16′45″N 71°25′00″W
- Country: United States
- State: Massachusetts
- County: Middlesex
- Region: New England
- Settled: 1650
- Incorporated (town): June 26, 1700
- Incorporated (city): January 1, 2018

Government
  - Type: City
  - Mayor: Charles Sisitsky
  - City council: George King, Chair; Janet Leombruno, Vice-Chair; Christine Long; Brendon Ward; Mary Kate Feeney; Michael Cannon; Noval Alexander; Phillip Ottaviani; Leora Mallach; John Stefanini; Tracey Bryant

Area
  - Total: 26.51 sq mi (68.65 km^{2})
  - Land: 25.04 sq mi (64.86 km^{2})
  - Water: 1.46 sq mi (3.78 km^{2})
- Elevation: 160 ft (50 m)

Population (2020)
  - Total: 72,362
  - Density: 2,889.4/sq mi (1,115.61/km^{2})
- Time zone: UTC−5 (Eastern)
  - Summer (DST): UTC−4 (Eastern)
- ZIP Codes: 01701 and 01702
- Area code: 508/774
- FIPS code: 25-24960
- GNIS feature ID: 0618224
- Website: framinghamma.gov

Framingham (/ˈfreɪmɪŋhæm/) is a city in the Commonwealth of Massachusetts, United States. Incorporated in 1700, it is located in Middlesex County and the MetroWest subregion of the Greater Boston metropolitan area. The city proper covers 25 square miles (65 km^{2}) with a population of 72,362 in 2020, making it the 14th most populous municipality in Massachusetts. Residents voted in favor of adopting a charter to transition from a representative town meeting system to a mayor–council government in April 2017, and the municipality transitioned to city status on January 1, 2018. Before it transitioned, it had been the largest town by population in Massachusetts.

The city has one of the largest Brazilian American populations in the United States, with a considerable Brazilian presence since the 1980s.

== History ==
Prior to English settlement, the region around Framingham was inhabited by the indigenous Nipmuc. They lived in encampments established alongside the Washakamaug ("eel fishing place") or what is today called Farm Pond. The Nipmuc Indians used game management techniques through the hunting of deer and beaver, fishing in ponds and streams, as well as established growing areas for the Three Sisters (squash, corn, beans) in the nearby hills. The ancient Indian trail later known as the Old Connecticut Path also ran through this area. During the initial period of colonization of the region by Puritan settlers, the Nipmuc suffered a rapid decline in population due to the introduction of foreign infectious diseases to which they had no immunity and violence related to their raiding settlements. Many of the Nipmuc people were forced into praying towns including nearby Natick.

The first European settler in the area was John Stone who established a farm on the west bank of the Sudbury River in 1647. In 1660, Thomas Danforth, an official of the Bay Colony received a grant of land at "Danforth's Farms" and began to accumulate over 15,000 acres (100 km^{2}).

Between 1675 and 1676, King Philip's War created great tensions between English settlers and the Nipmuc people in the area. During this time, Nipmuc leader Tantamous, who lived on Nobscot Hill and who resisted Christianization by the English, was arrested with his family members and other Nipmuc men by the colonial government in 1676 for what the colony deemed treason and they were incarcerated on Deer Island. He would escape, be recaptured, and later hanged on Boston Common. In January 1676, a group of Nipmuc men went to the Eames family homestead to demand that they return a supposedly stolen corn harvest. Although the historical record is unclear as to the exact details, this would result in an outbreak of violence between the Nipmuc men and the Eames family, where Mary Eames and five children were killed.

As more settlers moved to the town, it would be named Framlingham after Thomas Danforth's hometown in England. Over time, Thomas Danforth strenuously resisted petitions for incorporation of the town, which was officially incorporated in 1700, following his death the previous year. Why the "L" was dropped from the new town's name is not known. The first church was organized in 1701, the first teacher was hired in 1706, and the first permanent schoolhouse was built in 1716.

On February 22, 1775, the British general Thomas Gage sent two officers and an enlisted man out of Boston to survey the route to Worcester, Massachusetts. In Framingham, those spies stopped at Buckminster's Tavern. They watched the town militia muster outside the building, impressed with the men's numbers but not their discipline. Though "the whole company" came into the tavern after their drill, the officers remained undetected and continued on their mission the next day. Gage did not order a march along that route, instead ordering troops to Concord, Massachusetts, on April 18–19. Framingham sent two militia companies totaling about 130 men into the Battles of Lexington and Concord that followed; one of those men was wounded.

In the years before the American Civil War, Framingham was an annual gathering-spot for members of the abolitionist movement. Each Independence Day from 1854 to 1865, the Massachusetts Anti-Slavery Society held a rally in a picnic area called Harmony Grove on Farm Pond near what is now downtown Framingham. At the 1854 rally, William Lloyd Garrison burned copies of the Fugitive Slave Law of 1850, judicial decisions enforcing it, and the United States Constitution. Other prominent abolitionists present that day included William Cooper Nell, Sojourner Truth, Wendell Phillips, Lucy Stone, and Henry David Thoreau.

In July 1906, the Amsden Building collapse, which occurred on Concord Street, claimed 12 lives (a 13th person died two years later, after being severely injured in the collapse). Following World War II, Framingham, like many other suburban areas, experienced a large increase in population and housing during the mid-20th-century baby boom. Much of the housing constructed during that time consisted of split-level houses and ranch-style houses.

Framingham is known for the Framingham Heart Study, as well as for the Dennison Manufacturing Company, which was founded in 1844 as a jewelry and watch box manufacturing company by Aaron Lufkin Dennison, who became the pioneer of the American System of Watch Manufacturing at the nearby Waltham Watch Company. His brother Eliphalet Whorf Dennison developed the company into a sizable industrial complex which merged in 1990 into Avery Dennison, with headquarters in Pasadena, California, and active corporate offices in the town.

In 2000, Framingham celebrated its tercentennial. Framingham soon rose to become the largest town in Massachusetts, commonly referred to by the people of Framingham as "The largest town in the country." Framingham had attempted to become a city on three prior occasions 1993, 1997, and 2013, all of which were rejected by the people of Framingham. However, on January 1, 2018, Framingham became a city and Yvonne M. Spicer was inaugurated as its first mayor, thus becoming the first popularly elected African-American female mayor in Massachusetts.

== Geography ==
According to the United States Census Bureau, the city has an area of 26.4 square miles (68.5 km^{2}), of which 25.1 square miles (65.1 km^{2}) is land and 1.3 square miles (3.4 km^{2}) (4.99%) is water.

=== Neighborhoods ===
==== Golden Triangle ====
The Golden Triangle was originally a three square mile district on the eastern side of Framingham, bordered by Worcester Rd. (Route 9), Cochituate Rd. (Route 30), and Speen Street in Natick. In 1993, the area began to expand beyond the borders of the triangle with construction of a BJ's Wholesale Club and a Super Stop & Shop just north of Route 30. It now includes the original area plus parts of Old Connecticut Path., Concord St. (Route 126), and Speen St. north of Route 30. Because of the size and complexity of this area, Framingham and Natick cooperatively operate it as a single distinct district with similar zoning. The area is one of the largest shopping districts in New England.

The area was formed with the construction of Shoppers World in 1951. Shoppers' World was a large open air shopping mall, the second in the US and the first east of the Mississippi River. The mall drew many other retail construction projects to the area, including Marshalls (1961, rebuilt as Bed Bath & Beyond 1997), Caldor (1966, Rebuilt as Wal-Mart in 2002), Bradlees (1960s, rebuilt as Kohl's in 2002), the Route 30 Mall (1970), an AMC Framingham 15, the Framingham Mall (1978, rebuilt 2000), and Lowe's (formerly the Verizon Building, 2006). Complementary developments in Natick include the Natick Mall (1966, rebuilt in 1991, expanded 2007 & renamed Natick Collection), Sherwood Plaza (1960), Cloverleaf Marketplace (1978), and the Home Depot. In 1994, Shoppers' World was demolished and replaced with a strip mall named Shoppers World. There are also seven hotels and two car dealerships located within the Triangle.

In addition to retail properties, there are large office developments in the area including several companies headquartered in the triangle; the world headquarters of TJX is at the junction of Route 30 and Speen St, as is the main office of IDG and IDC. The American Cancer Society has an office in Framingham. A Carling Brewery began operations in 1956, ending in 1975. Their buildings later housed Prime Computer and Boston Scientific before demolition in 2018 for a new MathWorks facility. Sealtest had a manufacturing facility in Framingham which was used by Breyers from 1964 to 2011

==== Downtown and South Framingham ====
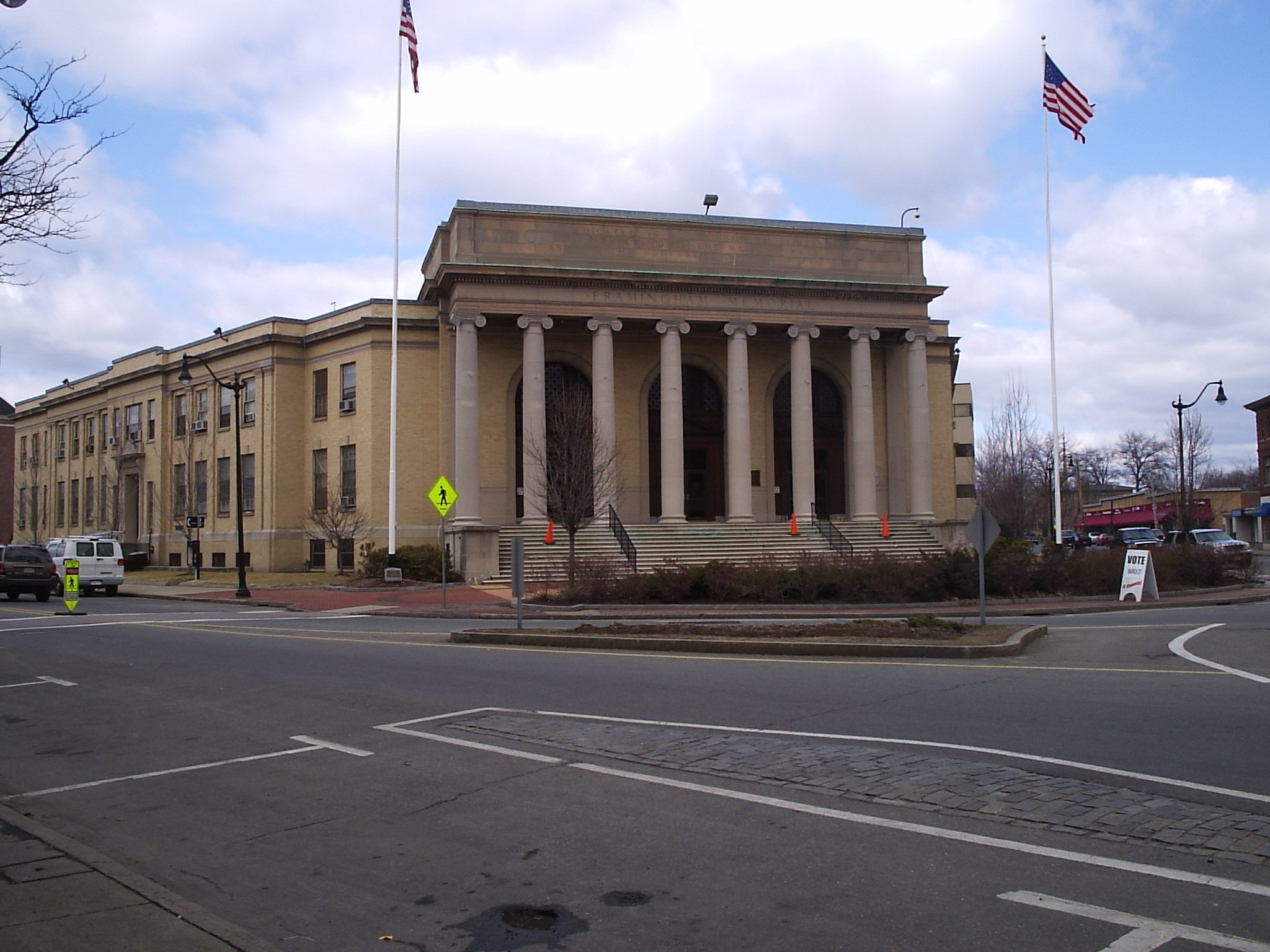
The Memorial Building, Framingham's town hall

Framingham Public Library, Lexington St.

The downtown area is between Memorial Square, formed by the intersection of Concord St. and Union Ave., to the north, and its mirror intersection at the junction of Irving St. and Hollis St. on the south end. The area is bisected by Waverly St. (Route 135) and the MBTA Commuter Rail tracks. The anchoring structure of Downtown is the city hall, The Memorial Building. From 2015 to 2016, the whole area underwent a multimillion-dollar reconstruction of the intersection of Union Ave. and Concord St. that replaced the traffic circle with a signal-controlled intersection. Additional lights were installed at the Irving St./Hollis St. intersection, while older signals in the area were upgraded. All sidewalks in the area were to be replaced, lighting upgraded, and new amenities such as seating and bicycle racks were also installed. The project was scheduled to begin in 2012 but has been delayed to 2014–2015. Further delays pushed the project into 2015 due to needed electrical utility upgrades and replacement.

South Framingham became the commercial center of the town with the advent of the railroad in the 1880s. It eventually came to house Dennison Manufacturing and the former General Motors Framingham Assembly plant, but the area underwent a financial downturn after the closure of these facilities during the late 1980s. An influx of Hispanic and Brazilian immigrants helped to revitalize the district starting in the early 2000s. Along with Brazilian and Spanish oriented retail shops, there are restaurants, legal and financial services, the city offices and library, police headquarters, a performing arts center, and the local branch of the Social Security Administration. Several Asian and Indian stores and restaurants add to the rich ethnic flavor of the area, and many small businesses, restaurants and automotive-oriented shops line Waverly St. from Natick in east to Winter St. in the west.

In 2006, the Fitts Market & Hemenway buildings façades underwent a restoration project; these newly renovated structures received a 2006 Massachusetts Historical Commission Preservation Award in the Restoration and Rehabilitation Category. In addition, several retail and housing projects involving the Arcade Building and the former Dennison Building Complex are in the planning stages or under construction.

==== West Framingham ====
The business section on the West Side of Framingham runs primarily along Route 9, starting at Temple St., and is dominated by two large office/industrial parks: the Framingham Industrial Park on the north side of Route 9 and another park on the south side, both on the Framingham/Ashland/Southborough border. Bose, Staples and Applause have their world headquarters in these parks, as does convenience store chain Cumberland Farms; in addition, Netezza, Genzyme, Capital One, CA Technologies, ITT Tech and the local newspaper The MetroWest Daily News all have major facilities there. Two of Framingham's seven major auto dealerships are also in West Framingham.

The large tracts of multi-story apartment and condominium complexes line both sides of Route 9 from Temple St. to the industrial parks. These buildings represent the majority of Framingham's multi-family dwellings, and along with the business complexes, helped create a large network of support services on the West Side: a supermarket, dozens of restaurants and pubs, hotels and a large day-care facility all are in the two-mile (3 km) section of Route 9 from Temple St. to Ashland.

==== Villages and Route 9 ====
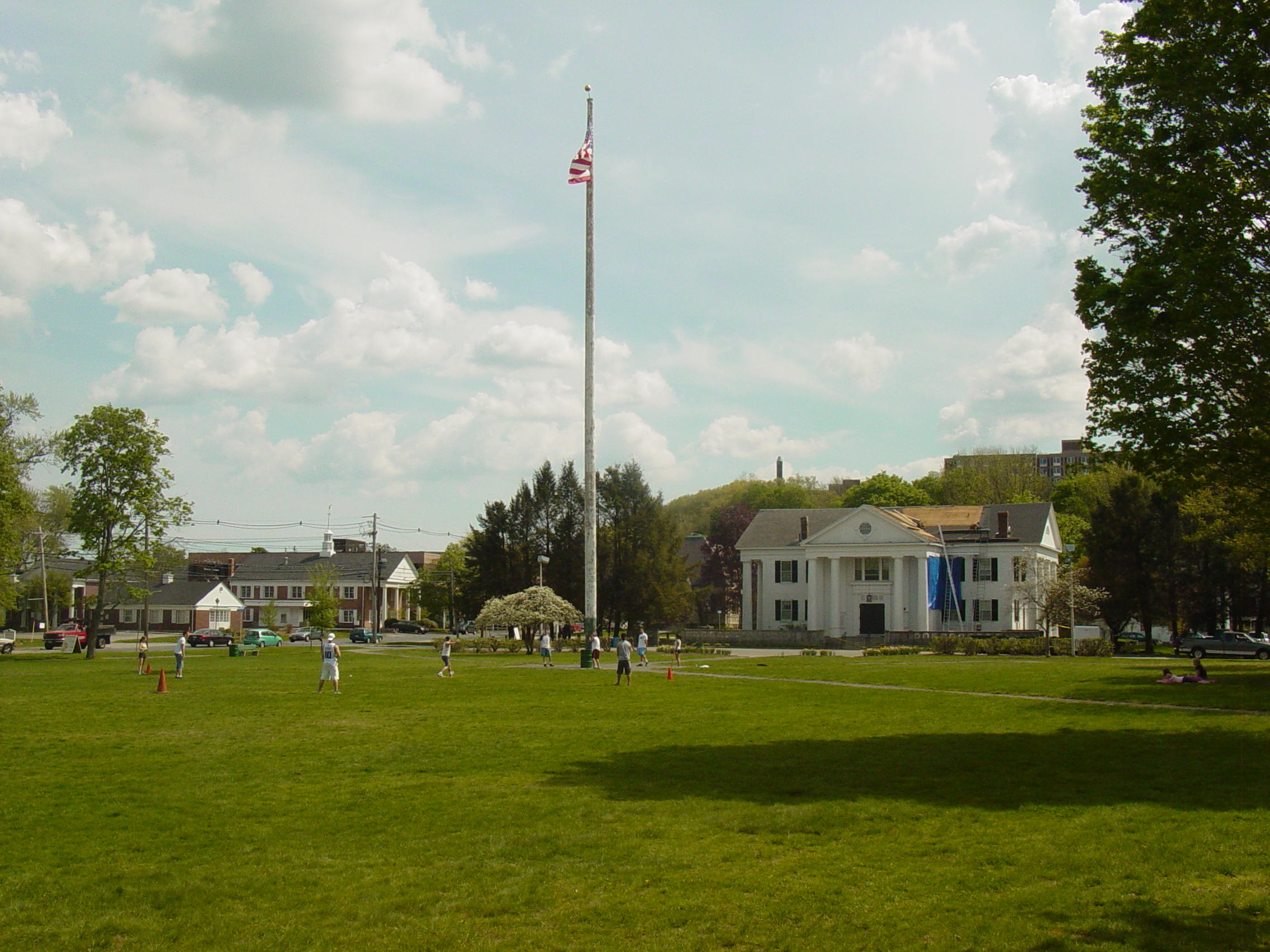
The Common in Framingham Center

The Framingham Centre Common Historic District is the city's physical and historic center. Formed at the junctions of Worcester Rd. (Route 9), Pleasant St. (Route 30), High St., Main St. and Edgell Rd. the dominating presence is Framingham State University. The school has several thousand students, about one third of whom live on campus. In the late 1960s, MassHighway replaced the intersection with an overpass, depressing Route 9 below the local roads, and destroying the south half of the old Center retail district. The remaining half houses several small stores, restaurants, realtors and legal offices. The old Boston and Worcester Street Railway depot, on the east side of the center, was converted into a strip mall in the early 1980s and houses the Center Postal Station (01703) and several small stores. The center is rounded out by One and Two Edgell Rd. (two small retail/office buildings), the historic village hall, the Jonathan Maynard Building (a former school, now a part of the Framingham State University campus which houses the Danforth Art Museum ), the Framingham History Center (formerly the Framingham Historical Society and Museum), several banks, a Chinese restaurant, the American Medical Response paramedic station and McCarthy Office Building.

The village of Nobscot, at the intersection of Water St., Edmands Rd. and Edgell Rd. near Nobscot Hill, and the Pinefield/Saxonville villages, located where Concord St., Water St., and Central St. intersect, are home to several small office buildings, strip malls and gas stations. in 2016, the town moved its satellite branch of the public library named for Christa McAuliffe from Saxonville to a new facility across from the Hemenway School in Nobscot. Saxonville is the home of the former Roxbury Carpet Company mill complex buildings (originally powered by the adjoining Sudbury River), now an industrial park, and is one of the city's historical districts.

== Demographics ==
Historical population
Year	Pop.	±%
1790	1,598	—
1850	4,252	+166.1%
1860	4,227	−0.6%
1870	4,968	+17.5%
1880	6,235	+25.5%
1890	9,239	+48.2%
1900	11,302	+22.3%
1910	12,948	+14.6%
1920	17,033	+31.5%
1930	22,210	+30.4%
1940	23,214	+4.5%
1950	28,086	+21.0%
1960	44,526	+58.5%
1970	64,048	+43.8%
1980	65,113	+1.7%
1990	64,989	−0.2%
2000	66,910	+3.0%
2010	68,318	+2.1%
2020	72,362	+5.9%
2024	73,361	+1.4%
Source: United States census records and Population Estimates Program data. Source: U.S. Decennial Census

=== 2020 census ===
As of the 2020 census, Framingham had a population of 72,362. The median age was 38.3 years. 20.5% of residents were under the age of 18 and 16.1% of residents were 65 years of age or older. For every 100 females there were 96.2 males, and for every 100 females age 18 and over there were 93.7 males age 18 and over.

99.1% of residents lived in urban areas, while 0.9% lived in rural areas.

There were 27,555 households in Framingham, of which 30.5% had children under the age of 18 living in them. Of all households, 47.3% were married-couple households, 19.6% were households with a male householder and no spouse or partner present, and 27.3% were households with a female householder and no spouse or partner present. About 27.4% of all households were made up of individuals and 11.6% had someone living alone who was 65 years of age or older.

There were 29,033 housing units, of which 5.1% were vacant. The homeowner vacancy rate was 0.6% and the rental vacancy rate was 5.5%.

Racial composition as of the 2020 census
Race	Number	Percent
White	40,685	56.2%
Black or African American	4,517	6.2%
American Indian and Alaska Native	338	0.5%
Asian	5,267	7.3%
Native Hawaiian and Other Pacific Islander	26	0.0%
Some other race	11,603	16.0%
Two or more races	9,926	13.7%
Hispanic or Latino (of any race)	12,171	16.8%

=== 2010 census ===
As of the census of 2010, there were 68,318 people, 26,173 households, and 16,535 families residing in the city. The population density was 2,732.7 inhabitants per square mile (1,055.1/km^{2}). There were 27,529 housing units, of which 1,356, or 4.9%, were vacant. The racial makeup of the city was 71.9% White, 5.8% Black, 0.3% Native American, 6.3% Asian, 0.1% Pacific Islander, 10.9% from some other race, and 4.6% from two or more races. Hispanic or Latino of any race were 13.4% of the population (4.7% Puerto Rican, 1.8% Guatemalan, 1.5% Salvadoran, 1.1% Dominican, 0.9% Mexican, 0.6% Colombian, 0.3% Peruvian). (Source: 2010 Census Quickfacts)

Of the 26,173 households, 31.1% had children under the age of 18 living with them, 48.2% were headed by married couples living together, 10.8% had a female householder with no husband present, and 36.8% were non-families. 28.4% of all households were made up of individuals, and 10.0% were someone living alone who was 65 years of age or older. The average household size was 2.47, and the average family size was 3.03.

As of 2010, 20.9% of the population were under the age of 18, 9.8% were from 18 to 24, 30.0% were from 25 to 44, 25.8% were from 45 to 64, and 13.6% were 65 years of age or older. The median age was 38.0 years. For every 100 females, there were 93.5 males. For every 100 females age 18 and over, there were 90.8 males.

=== Income and poverty ===
In 2017, the estimated median income for a household in the city was $84,050, and the median income for a family was $101,078. Male full-time workers had a median income of $61,659, versus $54,714 for females. The per capita income for the city was $38,917. About 7.5% of families and 11.2% of the population were below the poverty line, including 12.7% of those under age 18 and 9.4% of those age 65 or over.

=== Immigration ===
Brazilian immigrants have a major presence in Framingham. Since the 1980s, a large segment of the Brazilian population has come from the single city of Governador Valadares.

== Economy ==
Framingham's economy is predominantly derived from retail and office complexes. There are scatterings of small manufacturing facilities and commercial services such as plumbing, mechanical and electrical expected to be found in communities of its size. Framingham has three major business districts within the city, The "Golden Triangle", Downtown/South Framingham, and West Framingham. Additionally, there are several smaller business hubs in the villages of Framingham Center, Saxonville, Nobscot, and along the Route 9 corridor.

== Arts and culture ==
- Amazing Things Arts Center
- Buckminster Square- site of the Revolutionary War statue depicting a Blacksmith preparing for the march up Battle Road in 1775.
- Framingham Community Theater
- Framingham History Center (formerly the Framingham Historical Society and Museum)
- Danforth Museum
- Metrowest Youth Symphony Orchestra
- Pike Haven Homestead was built in 1693 by Jeremiah Pike. He and his descendants were town and militia officers, yeomen, and makers of spinning wheels in the colonial period. This house had been occupied by the same family for eight generations.

=== Points of interest ===
Framingham features dozens of athletic fields and civic facilities spread throughout the city in schools and public parks. Many of the recreational facilities were constructed by the Civilian Conservation Corps during the New Deal.

== Parks and recreation ==
- Bowditch Field is Framingham's main athletic facility. It is on Union Avenue midway between Downtown and Framingham Center and was the main athletic facility for the town. It houses a large multi-purpose football stadium that included permanent bleachers on both sides of the field. There is still a baseball field, tennis courts, a track and field practice area, and the headquarters of the city Parks Department. Bowditch, along with Butterworth and Winch Parks, were all built during the Great Depression of the 1930s as WPA projects. It underwent a complete renovation/reconstruction in 2010. It is also the current site of Framingham High's graduation ceremony.
- Butterworth Park is at the corner of Grant St and Arthur St. The park occupies a square block near downtown. The park has a baseball stadium that includes permanent bleachers on one side of the field, a basketball court and a tennis court. There is street parking on three sides. The bleachers have since been taken down.
- Winch Park is the sister park to Butterworth and is in Saxonville next to the Framingham High School. It includes a baseball stadium that includes permanent bleachers on one side of the field, a basketball court, tennis courts and two large practice fields used for football, soccer and lacrosse. There are two additional multi-use fields on the other side of the high school's gymnasium building.
- Callahan State Park is a large state park run by the DCR located in North Framingham in the city's northwest corner.
- Cochituate State Park on Lake Cochituate has a small section in Framingham where Saxonville Beach is on the north western shore of the lake.
- Danforth Park on Danforth Street, not far from the Wayland town line. The small park has playground with a half basketball court and a small baseball/kickball field.
- Framingham Common is in Framingham Center in front of the old Town Hall along Edgell Road and Vernon Street. It features an outdoor stage for concerts and other fair weather events. It is a favorite of the students of Framingham State University, and the site of their annual graduation ceremonies.
- Cushing Park on the South Side is a passive recreational area. The Framingham Peace and 9/11 Memorials are within the park across the street from Farm Pond, along with the Cushing Chapel. During World War II, the United States War Department constructed the Cushing General Hospital (named for Dr. Harvey Cushing) on this site; the chapel was part of the hospital complex. After the Korean War the hospital was sold to the Commonwealth of Massachusetts for use as a geriatric hospital. After the hospital was closed in 1991, the land was converted into a 57-acre public park.
- Long Athletic Complex On the south side of Framingham, near downtown the complex is the host of three little league baseball diamonds (Carter, Tusconi, Merloni), two Babe Ruth baseball fields (one being Long field), a softball field, outdoor basketball court, and two concession stands. The complex is surrounded by Keefe Tech High School, Loring Arena, and Barbari Elementary School. All of the fields have lights, and they host almost all of Framingham's Little League games. Long field is the host of JV high school games as well as most Framingham Babe Ruth games. The concession stands are both non-profit and all the money goes to the Framingham baseball league.

=== Conservation land ===
- Framingham has about 400 acres (1.6 km^{2}) of land that has been placed into public conservation.
  - The Wittenborg Woods was donated to the town in 1999 by Harriet Wittenborg. The properties were originally purchased from Henry Ford in the 1940s. Henry Ford owned all of the land around the Wayside Inn in nearby Sudbury, and Harriet (and her husband) were required to interview with Mr. Ford to determine if they would be good stewards of the land.
  - The Morency Woods is a parcel of land that is physically located in Natick, Massachusetts on the Framingham border, but which is owned by the City of Framingham. This forested land was used as a sewer bed up until the mid-1940s and was placed into conservation in 2001.
- The Sudbury Valley Trustees has approximately 200 acres (0.8 km^{2}) of land in North Framingham and along the Sudbury River in a private conservation trust.

=== Recreation ===
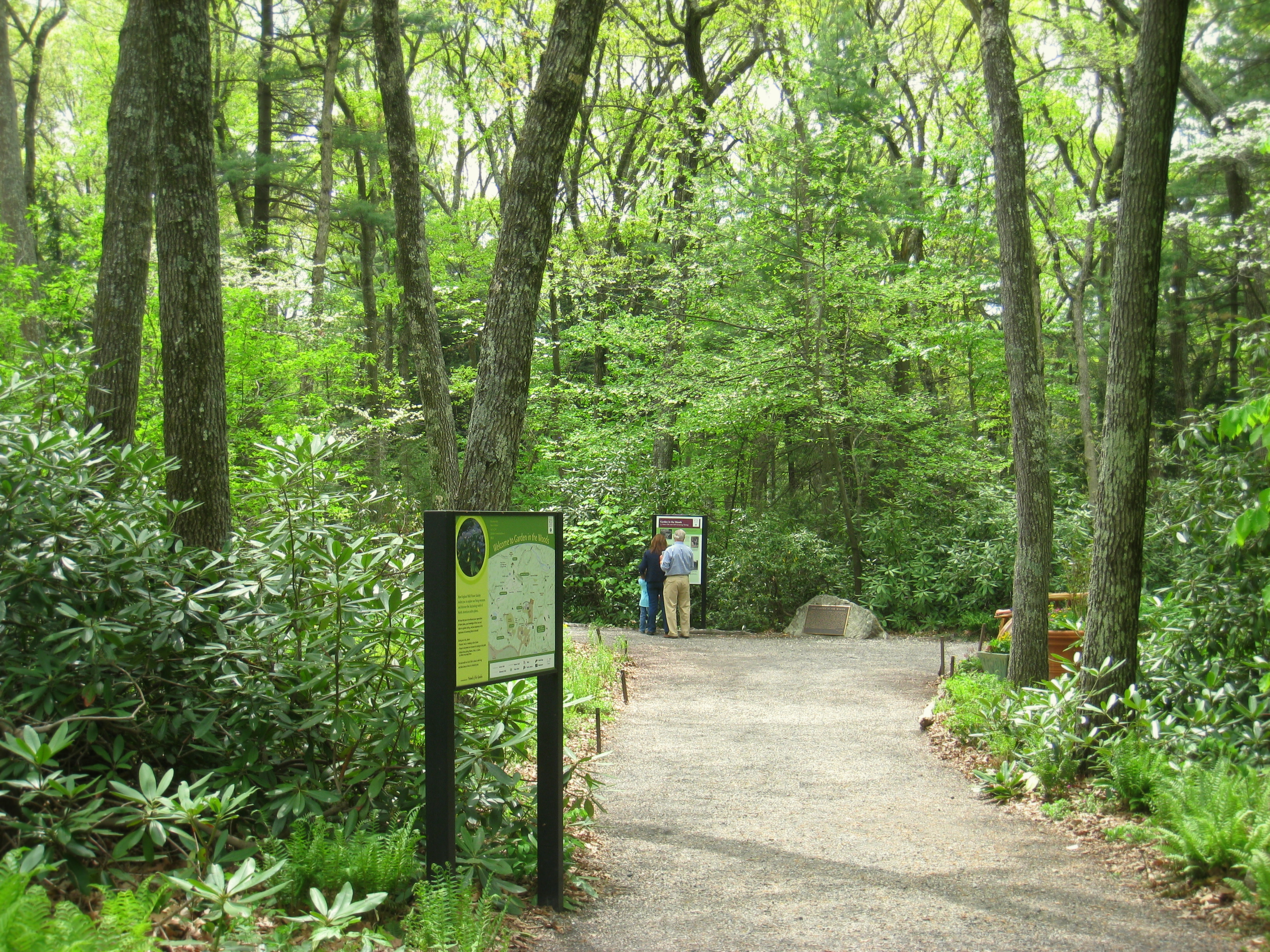
Garden in the Woods

- Garden in the Woods, operated by the New England Wild Flower Society, is a botanical garden that features the largest landscaped collection of native wildflowers in New England. It is in Nobscot, off of Hemenway Road.
- Framingham Country Club, along Salem End Road on the South Side, is a private club that features an 18-hole course with 6,580 yards (6,017 m) of golf from the longest tees for a par of 72.
- Nobscot Scout Reservation is a private facility owned by the Mayflower Council of the Boy Scouts of America and is open to the public during most of the year.
- The city has several public beaches including Saxonville beach on Lake Cochituate, Washakum Beach on Lake Washakum, and the beach at Learned Pond.
- The former Cushing hospital grounds serve as walking, biking, rollerblading, and picnic areas.
- Farm Pond in South Framingham once used to host Fourth of July Fireworks, now is a picnic area.
- Edward F. Loring Skating Arena, near Farm Pond at the corner of Fountain and Dudley Roads, is a municipal skating arena for area groups on a rental basis and public skating and stick time is available September through April.
- The Cochituate Rail Trail is a 3.7 mile, multi-use trail for walkers, joggers and bikers that runs from the Village of Saxonville in Framingham to Natick Center. While the Framingham section opened in 2015, the entire length of the trail opened to the public in 2021.

== Government ==
Framingham's Home Rule Charter was approved by voters on April 4, 2017, and took effect on January 1, 2018. On that date, Yvonne M. Spicer was inaugurated as Framingham's first mayor.

Elections are held in November of odd-numbered years, to elect a full-time mayor serving a four-year term, and an 11-member city council comprising nine district members serving two-year terms, and two at-large members serving four-year terms. The mayor replaced the Board of Selectmen as the chief executive, and the City Council replaced Representative Town Meeting as the legislative body. The mayor and at-large-councilors are limited to a maximum of three consecutive terms in office and district councilors are limited to six consecutive terms in office.

The School Committee has ten members: one elected from each of the nine districts, serving two-year terms, and the mayor, who serves as a tenth member and may only vote to break a tie.

The Board of Library Trustees and the Board of Cemetery Trustees have also elected positions serving for four-year terms, with half the membership elected at alternating municipal elections.

The Charter provides for an automatic review of the Charter five years after its adoption and periodically thereafter.

Presidential election results
Year	Democratic	Republican
2024	69.3% 20,681	27.7% 8,272
2020	73.7% 23,622	24.1% 7,712
2016	69.1% 20,520	23.8% 7,063
2012	66.1% 18,499	32.1% 8,978
2008	66.2% 17,839	31.4% 8,464
2004	66.2% 17,239	32.4% 8,448
2000	65.5% 17,308	27.8% 7,347
1996	65.8% 16,836	26.1% 6,669
1992	51.3% 15,165	27.5% 8,114
1988	54.7% 15,826	44.0% 12,745
1984	48.7% 14,368	51.1% 15,074
1980	41.7% 12,275	40.7% 11,979

== Education ==
The Framingham School Department can trace its roots back to 1706, when the town hired its first schoolmaster, Deacon Joshua Hemenway. Although Framingham had its first schoolmaster, it did not get its own public school building until 1716. The first high school, the Framingham Academy, opened its doors in 1792; however, this school was eventually closed due to financing issues and the legality of the town providing funds for a private school. The first town-operated high school opened in 1852, and has been in operation continuously in numerous locations throughout the town.

Framingham has 14 public schools which are part of the Framingham Public School District. These include Framingham High School, three middle schools (Walsh, Fuller, and Cameron), nine elementary schools (Barbieri, Brophy, Dunning, Hemenway, King, McCarthy, Potter Road, Stapleton, Harmony Grove), and the Blocks Pre-School. The school district's main offices are located in the Fuller Administration Building on Flagg Drive with additional offices at the King School on Water Street. The city also has a regional vocational high school and one regional charter school. Framingham is also home to several private schools, including Summit Montessori School, the Sudbury Valley School, one parochial school, one Jewish day school, and several specialty schools.

Since 1998, when Framingham began upgrading its schools, it has performed major renovations to Cameron, Wilson, McCarthy, Fuller and Framingham High School. Two public school buildings that were mothballed due to financial issues or population drops have been leased to the Metrowest Jewish Day School (at the former Juniper Hill Elementary) and Mass Bay Community College (at the former Farley Middle school). Several schools that were no longer being used were sold off, including Lincoln, Roosevelt, and Washington.

Framingham has three colleges, including Framingham State University and Massachusetts Bay Community College's Framingham Campus.

== Media ==
=== Newspapers and websites ===
The City of Framingham is served by:

- Framingham Source, a local news website.
- Framingham Online News, a local news and community information website.
- The MetroWest Daily News, a daily broadsheet.
- The Framingham Tab, a weekly local current events tabloid.
- The Boston Globe provides a regional edition called Globe West that covers Framingham and the MetroWest area.
- Boston.com has a Your Town website that covers Framingham.
- A Semana, a weekly, Brazilian-Portuguese language local current events tabloid.
- The Gatepost, a weekly student run newspaper published by Framingham State University.

=== Television and cable ===
Framingham has a public, educational, and government access (PEG) cable TV channel and local origination television station called Access Framingham (formerly FPAC-TV), that airs on Channel 9 Comcast, Channel 3 RCN and Channel 43 Verizon. Residents can create and produce their own television programs that reflect the personality of the community, and have them cablecast on the public-access television cable TV channels.

Framingham High School has a student-run television station, FHS-TV, that broadcasts locally; "Flyer News", its morning news program, has won 11 National High School Emmy Awards.

The City of Framingham operates the Government Channel shown on Comcast channel 99, RCN 13/HD613, and Verizon 42. The Government Channel operation provides programming sponsored by or for the City of Framingham. Commission meetings are cablecast live to inform residents and encourage participation in local government. Some of the programming provided, keeps residents abreast of road closings, construction updates, recycling efforts, public safety information, and special events in the community. The Government Channel is committed to making local government more accessible to all residents.

=== Radio ===
- WXKS (AM 1200) is an AM broadcasting station featuring talk radio and religious programming. Owned by iHeartMedia and licensed to Newton, Massachusetts with studios on 99 Revere Beach Parkway in Medford, Massachusetts;
- WSRO (AM 650) is an AM broadcasting station featuring Portuguese-language programming that leases studio and tower space from WXKS. Owned by the Langer Broadcasting Group, LLC and licensed to Natick, Massachusetts with studios on 100 Mount Wayte Ave in Framingham;
- WQOM (AM 1060) is an AM broadcasting station featuring business talk radio programming that leases studio and tower space from WXKS. Owned by the Langer Broadcasting Group, LLC and licensed to Ashland, Massachusetts with studios on 100 Mount Wayte Ave in Framingham;
- WDJM-FM (91.3 FM) is Framingham State University's FM broadcasting station that features an open format with progressive rock, hip-hop, metal and electronic music. It is owned by the Commonwealth of Massachusetts and is licensed to Framingham, Massachusetts with studios at 100 State St. in Framingham;
- Framingham Amateur Radio Association is the local amateur radio enthusiasts group.

=== Film location ===
In 2016, Framingham was one of the settings for the film Patriots Day. In spring 2009, Framingham was used for the film The Company Men. Large parts of the film Don't Look Up were shot in Framingham.

== Infrastructure ==
=== Transportation ===
Framingham is approximately halfway between Worcester, the commercial center of Central Massachusetts, and Boston, New England's leading port and metropolitan area. Rail and highway facilities connect these major centers and other communities in the Greater Boston Metropolitan Area.

==== Air ====
The closest airport with scheduled international passenger traffic is Boston's Logan International Airport, 25 miles (40 km) from Framingham. Worcester Regional Airport, about 27 miles (43 km) away, began scheduled flights to Fort Lauderdale and Orlando in November 2013.

==== Major highways ====
Framingham is served by one Interstate and four state highways:

Route number	Type	Local name	Direction
Interstate 90	Interstate, limited access toll road	The Massachusetts Turnpike (Mass Pike)	east/west
Route 9	State route, divided highway	Worcester Rd. The Boston/Worcester Turnpike, Ted Williams Highway	east/west
Route 30	State route, partial divided highway	Cochituate Rd., Worcester Rd. and Pleasant St.	east/west
Route 126	State route, primary road	Old Connecticut Path, School St, Concord St., and Hollis St.	north/south
Route 135	State route, primary road	Waverly St.	east/west

==== Mass transit ====
===== Rail =====
- Direct rail service to Chicago via Amtrak's Lake Shore Limited, as well as to all other points on the Amtrak network via a connection in another city.
- MBTA commuter rail service is available to South Station and Back Bay Station, Boston, via the MBTA's Framingham/Worcester Line, which connects South Station in Boston and Union Station in Worcester. Travel time to Back Bay Station is 42–45 minutes. It was called the Framingham Commuter Rail Line, as Framingham was the end of the line, until rail traffic was expanded to Worcester in 1996. The line also serves Newton, Wellesley, Natick, Ashland, Southborough, Westborough, and Grafton.
- CSX provides freight rail service in Framingham.

===== Bus =====
- MassPort operates the Logan Express bus service seven days per week providing a direct connection to Logan Airport. The bus terminal and paid parking facility are on the Shoppers' World Mall property, off the Massachusetts Turnpike exit 13, between Route 9 and Route 30.
- Peter Pan Bus Lines provides service to Worcester, New York, and Boston.
- The Massachusetts Bay Transportation Authority (MBTA), provides THE RIDE, a paratransit service for the elderly and disabled.
- The MetroWest Regional Transit Authority (MWRTA) operates a regional bus service which provides service to other local routes connecting the various regions of town and fixed route public bus lines servicing multiple communities in the MetroWest region, including the towns of Ashland, Holliston, Hopkinton, Milford, Marlborough, Sudbury, Sherborn, Natick, and Weston.

===== Commuter services =====
Park and ride services:

- MassDOT operates a free park and ride facility at the parking lot at the intersection of Flutie Pass and East Road on the south side of Shoppers' World Mall.
- MassDOT also operates a free park and ride facility at a parking lot adjacent to exit 12 of the Massachusetts Turnpike, across from California Avenue on the west side of Framingham.

=== Police ===
The Framingham Police Department serves as the primary law enforcement agency for the city.

=== Healthcare ===
Framingham is served by MetroWest Medical Center (formerly Framingham Union Hospital, which also includes Leonard Morse Hospital campus in Natick)

== Notable people ==
=== Arts and sciences ===
- Dave Amato, current guitarist for REO Speedwagon
- Ezra Ames (1768–1836), portrait painter in the 18th–19th centuries
- Anthony Barbieri, comedy writer
- Daniel Belknap (1771–1815), composer
- Michael J. Clouse, songwriter, music producer
- Nancy Dowd, Academy Award winning screenwriter for Coming Home (1978)
- Alexander Rice Esty (1826–1881), architect
- Ginger Fish, member of Marilyn Manson
- Dr. Solomon Carter Fuller, pioneering African-American in the field of psychology and Alzheimer's disease
- Meta Vaux Warrick Fuller, prominent African-American sculptor and artist from the 1920s
- Greg F. Gifune, Novelist, Editor, Film Producer, born in Framingham
- Leila Goldkuhl, fashion model
- David Hayes, music director of The Philadelphia Singers, Director of Orchestral and Conducting Studies at Mannes College The New School for Music
- Esther A. Hopkins, chemist, environmental attorney, and Framingham selectwoman
- Amy Leventer, marine biologist, micropaleontologist, Antarctic researcher
- Og Mandino (1923–1996), author
- Joe Maneri (1927–2009), noted classical composer and jazz improviser
- Christa McAuliffe, teacher, astronaut killed in the Challenger disaster
- Jo Dee Messina, country music singer
- Gordon Mumma, composer
- Michael P. O'Leary, urologist
- Edward Lewis Sturtevant, botanist, scientist, author
- Nancy Travis, actress
- Rob Urbinati, stage director, playwright
- Sir Hubert Wilkins, Australian soldier, pilot, ornithologist, photographer and polar explorer; died in Framingham in 1958

=== Fictional ===
- Ted, a living teddy bear in the comedy franchise Ted

=== Media ===
- Tom Caron, New England Sports Network baseball analyst
- Katie Nolan, ESPN
- Jordan Rich, WBZ (AM) radio host
- Mike Reiss, ESPN Patriots Analyst

=== Military ===
- Richard W. Higgins, pilot in the USAF
- Donald K. Muchow, Chief of Chaplains of the U.S. Navy
- John Nixon, General in the Continental Army during the American Revolution
- Peter Salem, Revolutionary War soldier

=== Politics ===
- Crispus Attucks, killed in the Boston Massacre
- Deborah D. Blumer, Massachusetts State Representative for Framingham (2001–2006)
- Mary Beth Cahill, campaign manager for John Kerry's bid for presidency
- Josephine Collins, Suffragist; member of the National Woman's Party
- Jack Patrick Lewis, Massachusetts State Representative for 7th Middlesex District (2017–present)
- Robert Owens, Massachusetts State Representative and businessman
- Maria Robinson, Massachusetts State Representative for 6th Middlesex District (2019–present)
- Adam Schiff, U.S. senator for California
- Yvonne M. Spicer, first black Mayor of Framingham and the first African-American woman to be popularly elected mayor in the Commonwealth of Massachusetts
- Josiah Trowbridge, former mayor of Buffalo, New York

=== Religious ===
- Gerald Fitzgerald, Roman Catholic priest
- Paul S. Loverde, Retired Roman Catholic bishop of the Diocese of Arlington
- Charles Henry Parkhurst, clergyman and social reformer who broke Boss Tweed's Tammany Hall Democratic party political machine
- William A. Rice, Roman Catholic bishop in Belize

=== Sports ===
- Joe Almasian, Olympic bobsledder representing Armenia.
- Carmelo Hayes, pro wrestler
- Blake Bellefeuille, NHL forward
- David Blatt (born 1959), Israeli-American basketball player and coach (most recently, for the Cleveland Cavaliers)
- R. J. Brewer, pro wrestler
- Ron Burton, former NFL running back for the Boston Patriots, 1960 to 1965
- Carl Corazzini, NHL Hockey Player, Boston Bruins, Chicago Blackhawks, Detroit Red Wings, Edmonton Oilers
- Rich Gedman, former Major League Baseball catcher for the Boston Red Sox, 1980 to 1990
- Toby Kimball, NBA player for the Boston Celtics, San Diego Rockets, Milwaukee Bucks, Kansas City Kings, Philadelphia 76ers, and the New Orleans Jazz
- C. J. McLaughlin, racing driver
- Lou Merloni, Major League Baseball player for the Boston Red Sox, 1998 to 2003
- Leslie Milne, Olympic field hockey player and member of the bronze-medal 1984 U.S. Women's Field Hockey Team
- Kevin Nee, professional Strongman, youngest man ever to become professional Strongman
- Danny O'Connor, American professional boxer in the Light Welterweight division
- Tal Smith, baseball executive, former General Manager of the Houston Astros
- Mark Sweeney, Major League Baseball player
- Pie Traynor, former Major League Baseball player, now in the Major League Baseball Hall of Fame

== Sister cities ==
- Lomonosov, Russia
- Governador Valadares, Brazil

== See also ==
- Places of worship in Framingham, Massachusetts
- List of mill towns in Massachusetts
