= Yvonne M. Spicer =

American educator and politician

Yvonne Spicer
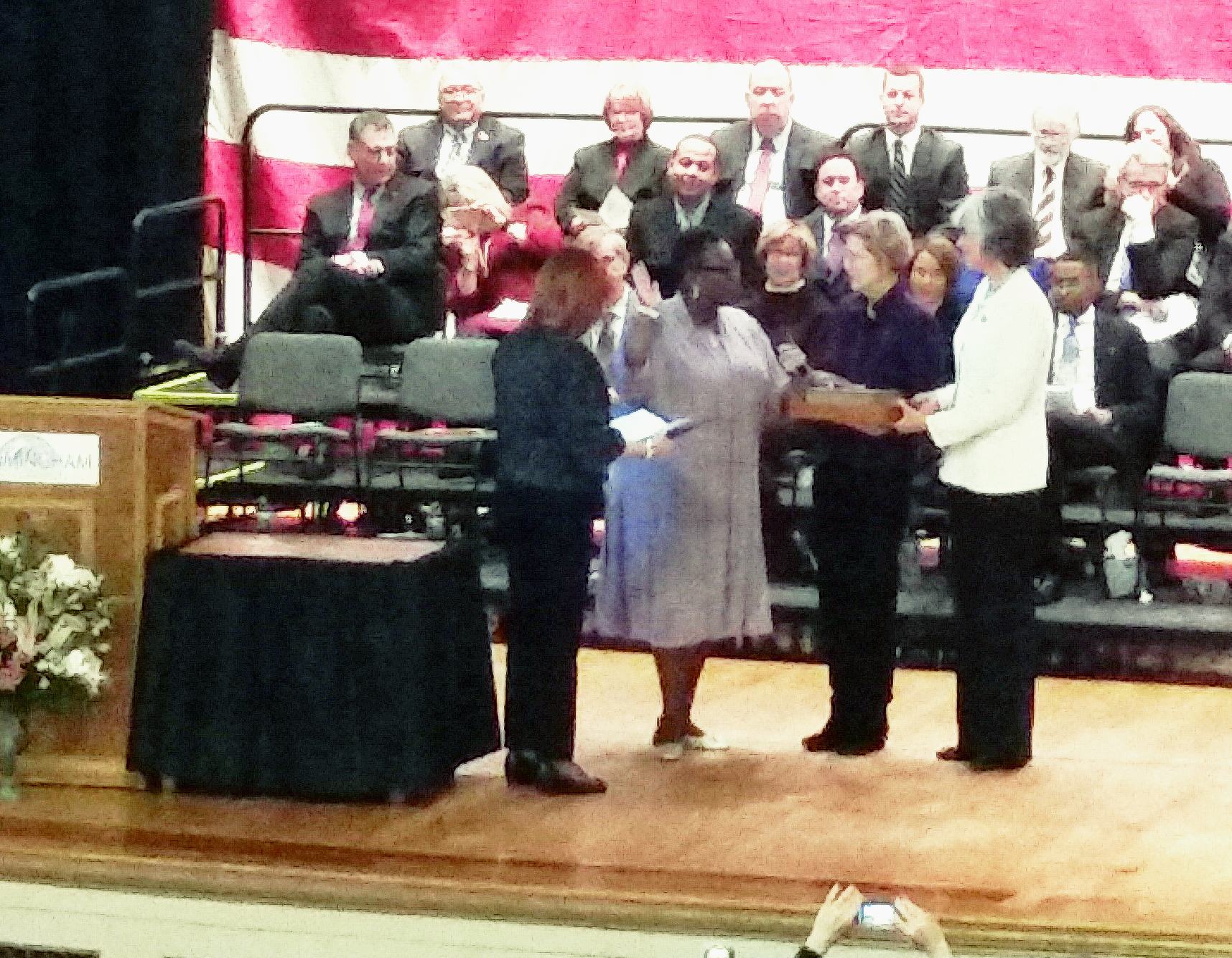

1st Mayor of Framingham, Massachusetts
- In office January 1, 2018 – January 1, 2022
- Preceded by: Office established
- Succeeded by: Charlie Sisitsky

Personal details
- Born: June 30, 1962 (age 64) New York, U.S.
- Party: Democratic
- Spouse: Divorced
- Education: State University of New York-Oswego (BS, MS); University of Massachusetts Boston (PhD)
- Profession: Educator

Dr. Yvonne Michelle Spicer (born June 30, 1962) is an American educator, democratic politician, and a former mayor from Framingham, Massachusetts. She was inaugurated on January 1, 2018, becoming the first African-American woman to be popularly elected mayor in Massachusetts, and served until she lost reelection on January 1, 2022 to Charles Sisitsky. She was previously the Vice President for Advocacy and Educational Partnerships at the Museum of Science in Boston, Massachusetts.

== Early life and education ==
Yvonne Spicer grew up in Brooklyn, New York, the third of four children of Willie and Dorothy Spicer. When she was six years old, a visit to her class by Shirley Chisholm left a lasting impression of the importance of leadership and public service. Spicer's father died when she was ten. She was 13 years old when she got her first job running errands, peeling potatoes and stocking shelves for a Brooklyn restaurant, and her first official job was working for McDonald's. During the summers, she also helped her mother clean houses on the Upper East Side. Spicer attended Catholic middle school and graduated from Brooklyn Technical High School, then earned a B.S. in industrial arts & technology in 1984, followed by an M.S. in technology education in 1985, both from the State University of New York at Oswego, from which she was the first African-American woman to graduate. She earned her doctorate in Educational Leadership from the University of Massachusetts Boston in 2004.

== Career ==
=== Education ===
After graduating from college, Spicer moved to Framingham, Massachusetts in 1985 for a job as a woodworking instructor. She worked in the Framingham Public Schools for 16 years, also teaching drafting, architecture, graphic arts, and photography, and eventually becoming Chair of Technology Education, the first woman to fill that position. During that period she also worked part-time as a realtor. She spent two years as Statewide Technology and Engineering Coordinator at the Massachusetts Department of Education, then five years as Director of Career and Technical Education in the Newton Public Schools. In 2006, Spicer was hired as associate director of the Museum of Science (Boston)'s National Center for Technological Literacy, where she rose to vice president for Advocacy and Educational Partnerships, a division she created and led.

=== Politics ===
Spicer served on the Framingham Human Relations Commission and the Democratic Town Committee. She was elected to Framingham's representative Town Meeting in 2016, where she served as vice-chair for Precinct 6, and on the Standing Committee on Ways and Means. Spicer was elected Framingham's first mayor in November 2017, following town's decision to change the format of the local government from a Board of Selectmen to a mayor and City Council. Senator Elizabeth Warren held the bible for Spicer's swearing in on January 1, 2018.

She was appointed by Governor Deval Patrick to the Massachusetts Governor's STEM Advisory Council in 2010, and reappointed to the council in 2017 by Governor Charlie Baker.

On November 2, 2021, Spicer lost her bid for re-election. Her term ended on January 1, 2022, with the inauguration of new mayor Charlie Sisitsky.

== Honors ==
- Selected by the National Aeronautics & Space Administration in 2000 to participate in an aerospace engineering program for technology educators
- Named Framingham State University's Global Education Teacher of the Year in 1993
- Received the Anti-Defamation League's 1995 "A World of Difference" Teacher Incentive Award
- Named one of 2009's ten "Women to Watch" by Mass High Tech: the Journal of New England Technology
- 2017 President-Elect to the International Technology Engineering Education Association (ITEEA)
