= Framingham Country Club =

Golf course in Framingham, Massachusetts

Coordinates: 42°17′30.2″N 71°27′58.8″W

The Framingham Country Club is a golf course located in Framingham, Massachusetts, United States, about twenty-five minutes west of Boston, Massachusetts off the Massachusetts Turnpike. The private golf club opened in 1902. As of 2006 the club had around 400 members. In 2009, joining the club required a $17,000 bond and $15,000 initiation fee for new members. Each member pays annual fees of about $5,100. The club is affectionately known by its members as the "Ham" and hosts a fall scratch tournament called “The Ham Invitational". The clubhouse manager is Michael Aw.

In 2002, a woman applied for a golfing membership at the club, but was put on a waiting list and not admitted. She later sued the club for gender discrimination. In 2006, the club paid her $262,000 settlement to end her lawsuit.

In 2019, former members of the club sued Framington for improperly withholding their membership bonds.

In 2020, the club hosted the Ouimet Memorial Championship and in 2022, the Mass Senior Amateur. In 2022, a fire at the facility caused over $500,000 in damage. In 2024, the club hosted the Massachusetts Amateur Championship.
