= Native Plant Trust =

Non-profit organization in the USA

Coordinates: 42°20′29.5″N 71°25′37.3″W

- Formation: 1900; 126 years ago
- Type: Nonprofit
- Tax ID no.: 04-2104768
- Legal status: 501(c)(3)
- Headquarters: 321 Commonwealth Road, Suite 204, Wayland, MA 01778
- Website: https://www.nativeplanttrust.org/
- Formerly called: Society for the Protection of Native Plants; New England Wild Flower Society

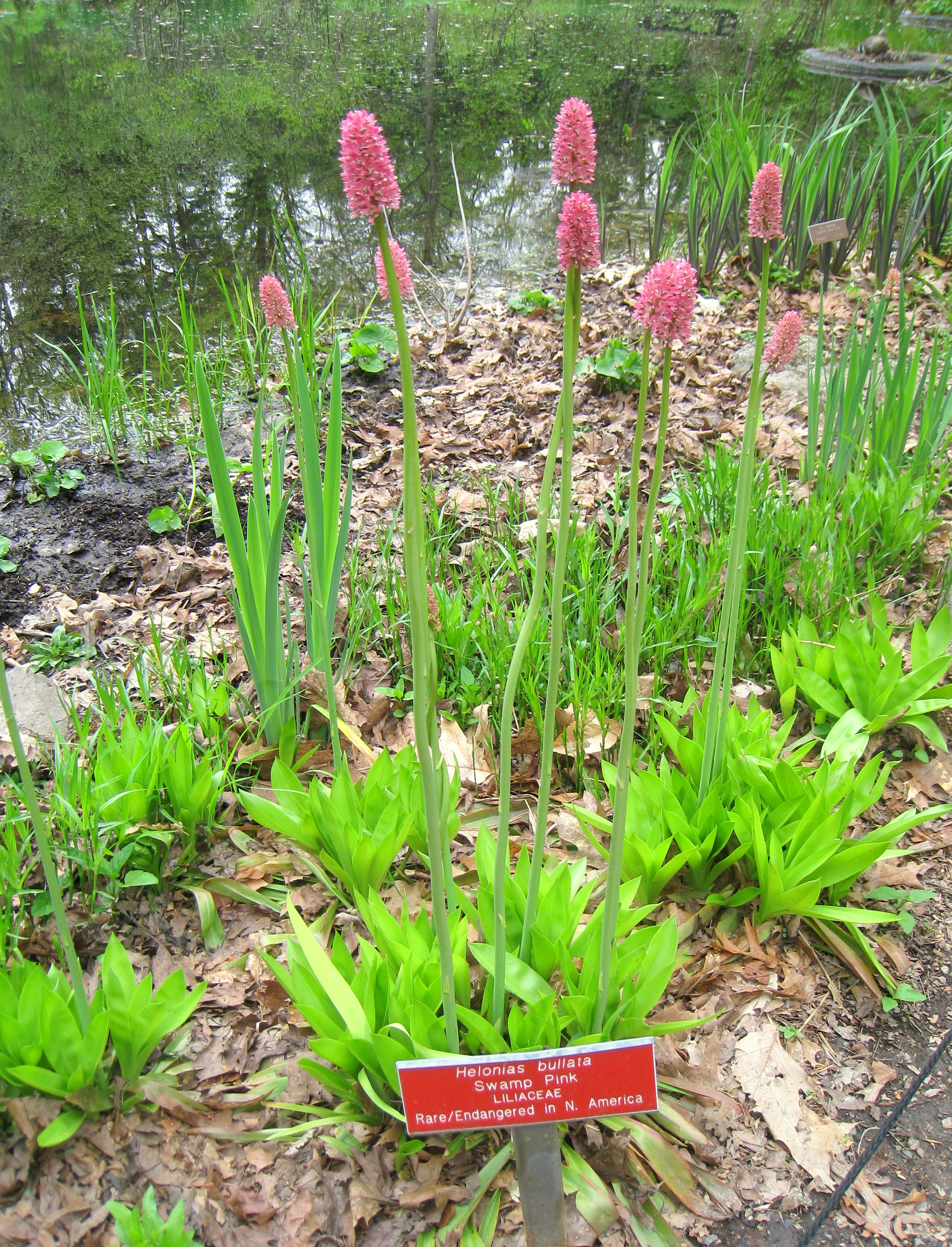
Swamp pink from the Garden in the Woods

Native Plant Trust, founded in 1900 as the Society for the Protection of Native Plants, and long known as the New England Wild Flower Society, is the nation's first plant conservation organization. The organization is dedicated to the preservation of native plants and operates Garden in the Woods, a native plant botanical garden, in Framingham, Massachusetts. It also offers courses on topics of conservation and horticulture of native plants, manages a "conservation corps" of volunteers throughout New England, operates several native plant sanctuaries, and offers nursery-propagated native plants for sale at its two nurseries. Since 2023, Native Plant Trust has been headquartered in Wayland, MA.

== Initiatives ==
Seed banking is a strategy used by the Native Plant Trust to preserve the genetic diversity of endangered plant species for potential future re-introductions. In proceeding with reintroductions of endangered species, guidelines are to be followed which evaluates the benefits and risks when considering re-introductions.

The Native Plant Trust promotes ecological gardening to help create a healthier ecosystem in any ecoregion. For New England, they have assembled a list of some of the native species to plant as well as invasive species to avoid in their region for gardeners to keep in mind when gardening or buying seeds for their garden. The Native Plant Trust hosts events throughout the year including family activities, tours, and social gatherings.
