= Learned Pond =

Lake in Massachusetts, United States

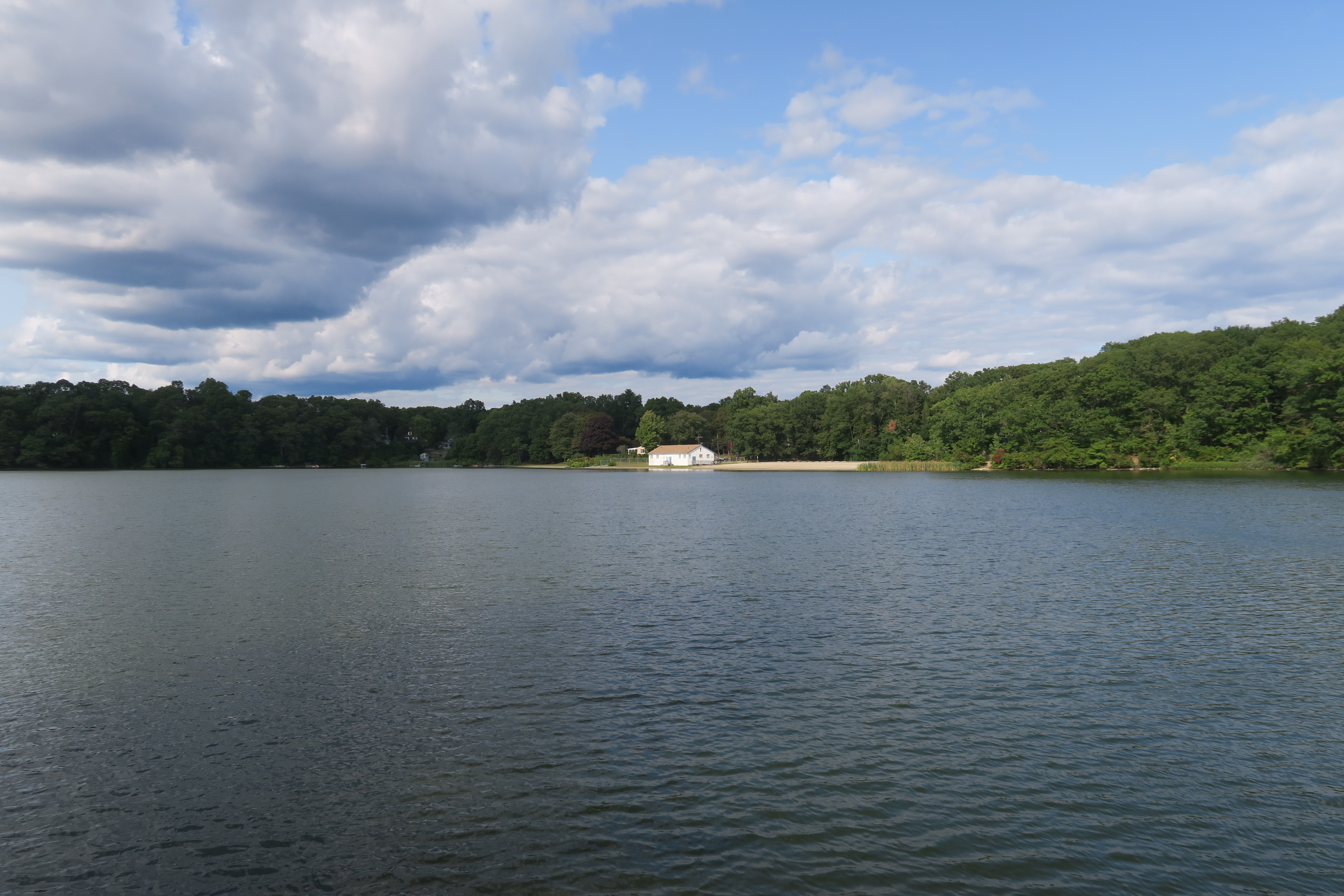
- Learned Pond

- Location within Massachusetts Location within the United States
- Location: Framingham, Massachusetts
- Coordinates: 42°17′15″N 71°25′10″W
- Surface elevation: 157 feet (48 m)

Learned Pond was formed during the last glaciation. It is next to Brigham Road and Union Ave in Framingham, Massachusetts next to MetroWest Medical Center at an elevation of 165 ft. The pond has a beach and is surrounded in parts by woods.
