= Allan Learned =

American football coach (1906–1967)

Allan Munford Learned (November 1, 1906 – July 12, 1967) was the interim head coach of the Virginia Tech Hokies football program during the closing portion of the 1950 season. Previous head coach, Bob McNeish, having won only one game in his first two seasons, was fired during the 1950 season, and with Learned the Hokies finished 0–10. Frank Moseley took over the permanent position in 1951.

Learned was born in Port Townsend, Washington on November 1, 1906.

A 1927 graduate of the University of Washington, Learned first joined Virginia Tech in 1947 as the junior varsity coach, before becoming head freshman mentor at the start of the 1949 season. He was also the head wrestling coach.

Learned then became the grid mentor at John Muir College in Pasadena, California.

Learned died on July 12, 1967, in Pasadena at the age of 60.
