= Cochituate Rail Trail =

Rail trail in Massachusetts, United States

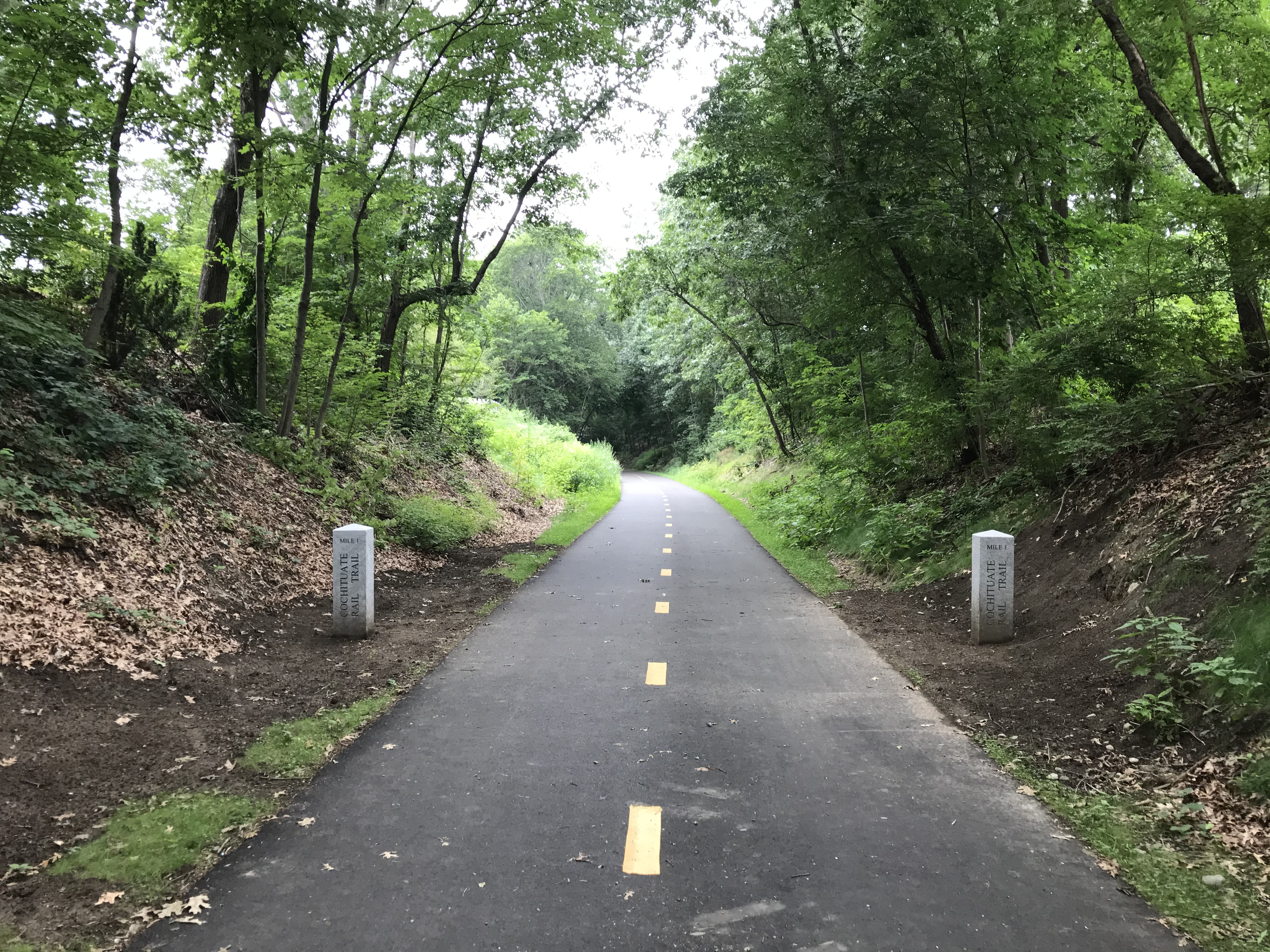
- Mile 1 markers on Cochituate Rail Trail in Natick, Massachusetts
- Length: 3.7 miles (6.0 km)
- Began construction: 2014
- Completed: 2021
- Use: Walking, bicycling, inline skating
- Difficulty: Easy
- Season: Year-round
- Sights: Lake Cochituate, Cochituate State Park
- Surface: Paved
- Right of way: Former Saxonville Branch of Boston and Albany Railroad
- Maintained by: Framingham and Natick
- Website: https://www.friendsofnaticktrails.org/crt

The Cochituate Rail Trail (CRT) is a rail trail in Framingham and Natick, Massachusetts. The CRT is a 3.7 miles (6.0 km), 12 feet (3.7 m) wide paved multi-use trail, available for walking, running, biking, rollerblading, and other non-motorized uses. It follows the right-of-way of the disused Saxonville Branch of Boston and Albany Railroad which was railbanked. The trail is maintained by the Towns of Natick and Framingham. The CRT is named after Lake Cochituate, of which it offers scenic views.

The CRT runs from Mechanic Street and Whitney Field/Navy Yard in Natick Center to Saxonville in Framingham. The Framingham section was completed in 2015, and the Natick section, including two pedestrian bridges spanning Route 30 and Route 9, was completed in 2021. There is a 0.2 mile spur in Natick named the Wonder Bread Spur in honor of the former ITT Continental Baking Wonder Bread factory, now connecting to the Natick Mall. The trail was built to meet the accessibility requirements of the Americans with Disabilities Act.

Three extensions are planned:

- The CRT will expand to the MBTA Natick Center station when the new rail station is completed, which is expected to be in May 2025.
- Natick is designing a connection to Main Street in Natick Center.
- MassDOT is designing a path along Route 9 to Hartford and Speen Streets in West Natick known as Lake Cochituate Path; construction is scheduled to begin in 2025.
Cochituate Rail Trail photos

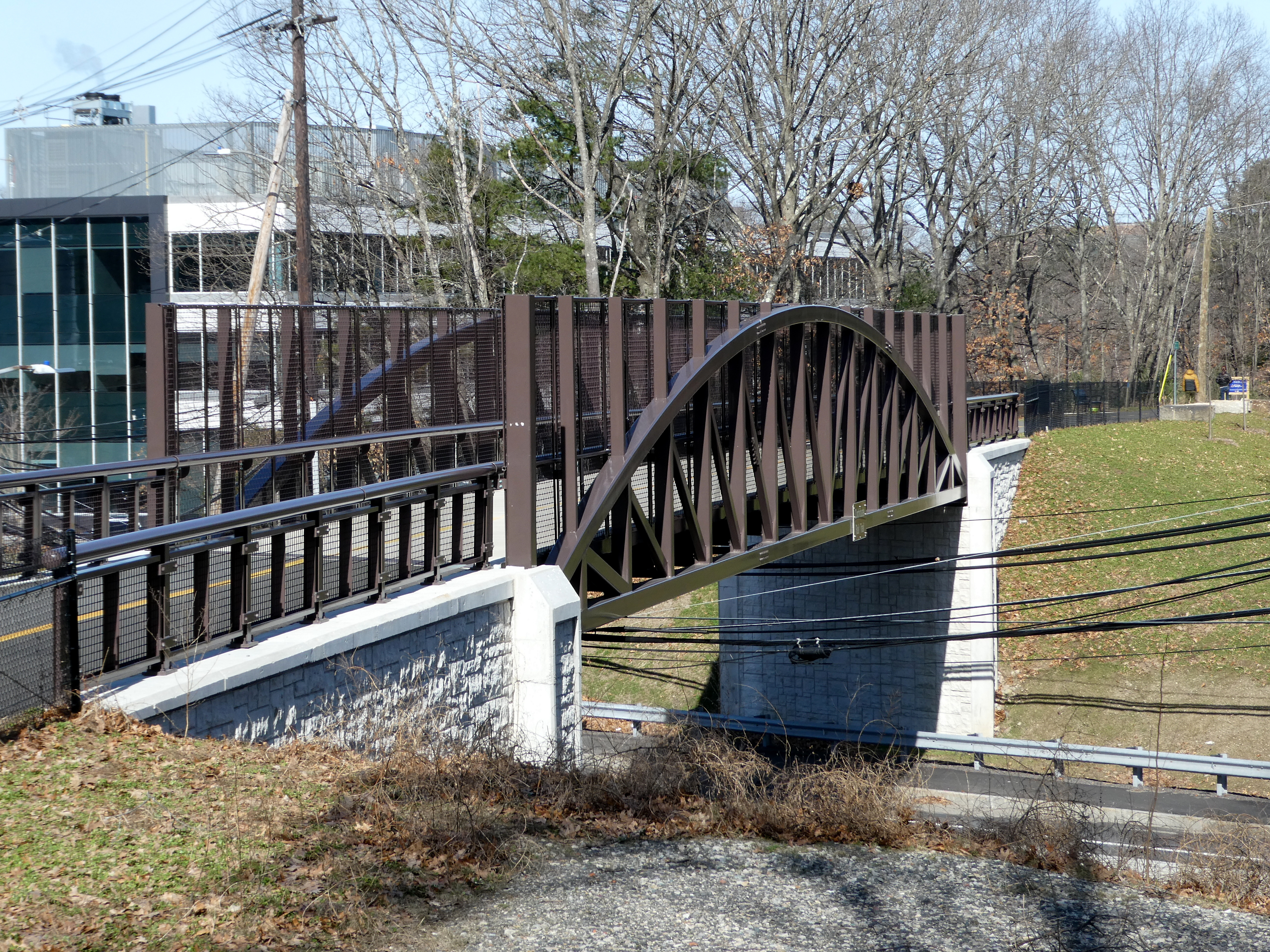
Bridge over Route 9 in Natick

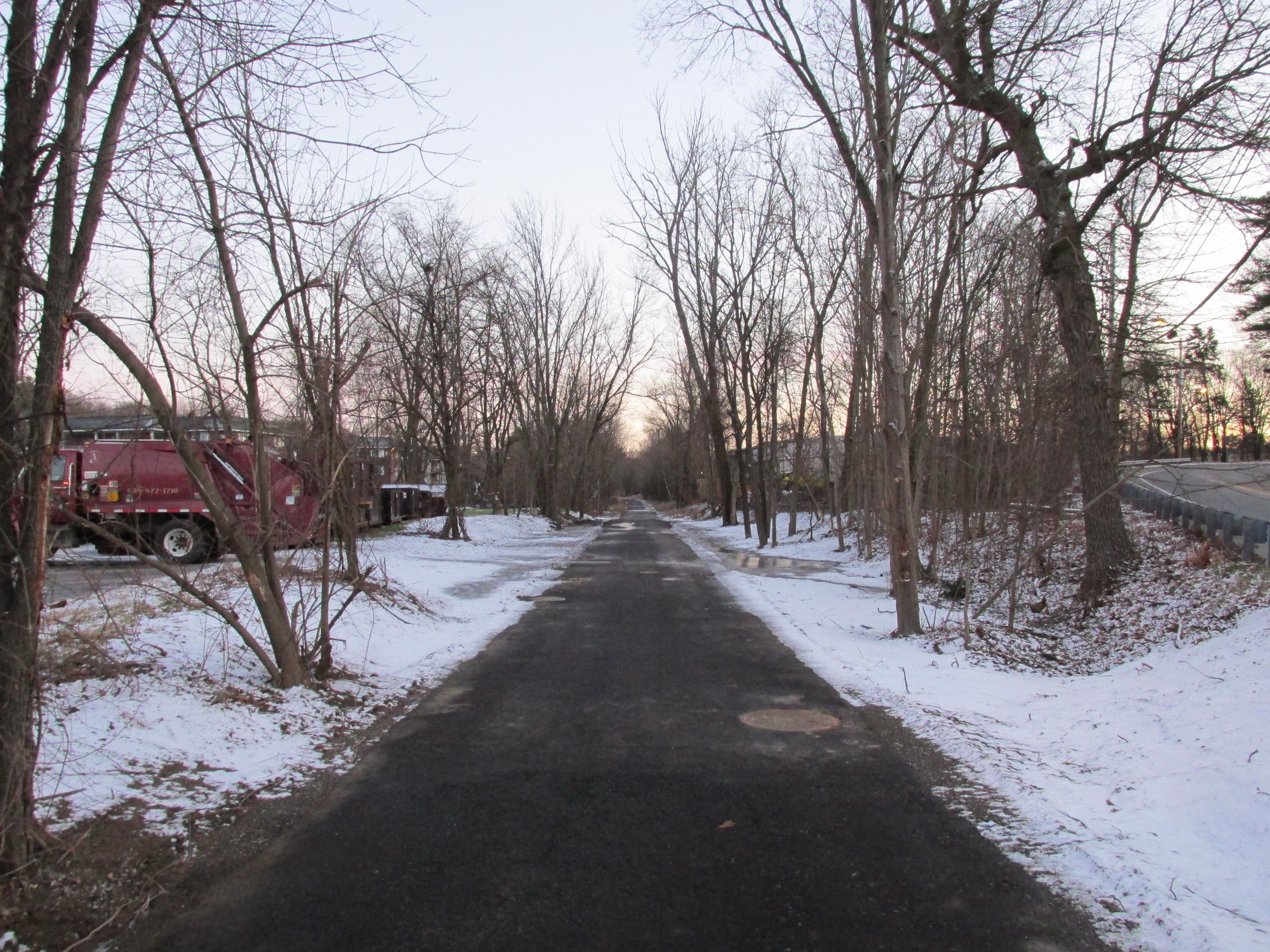
The CRT in Saxonville

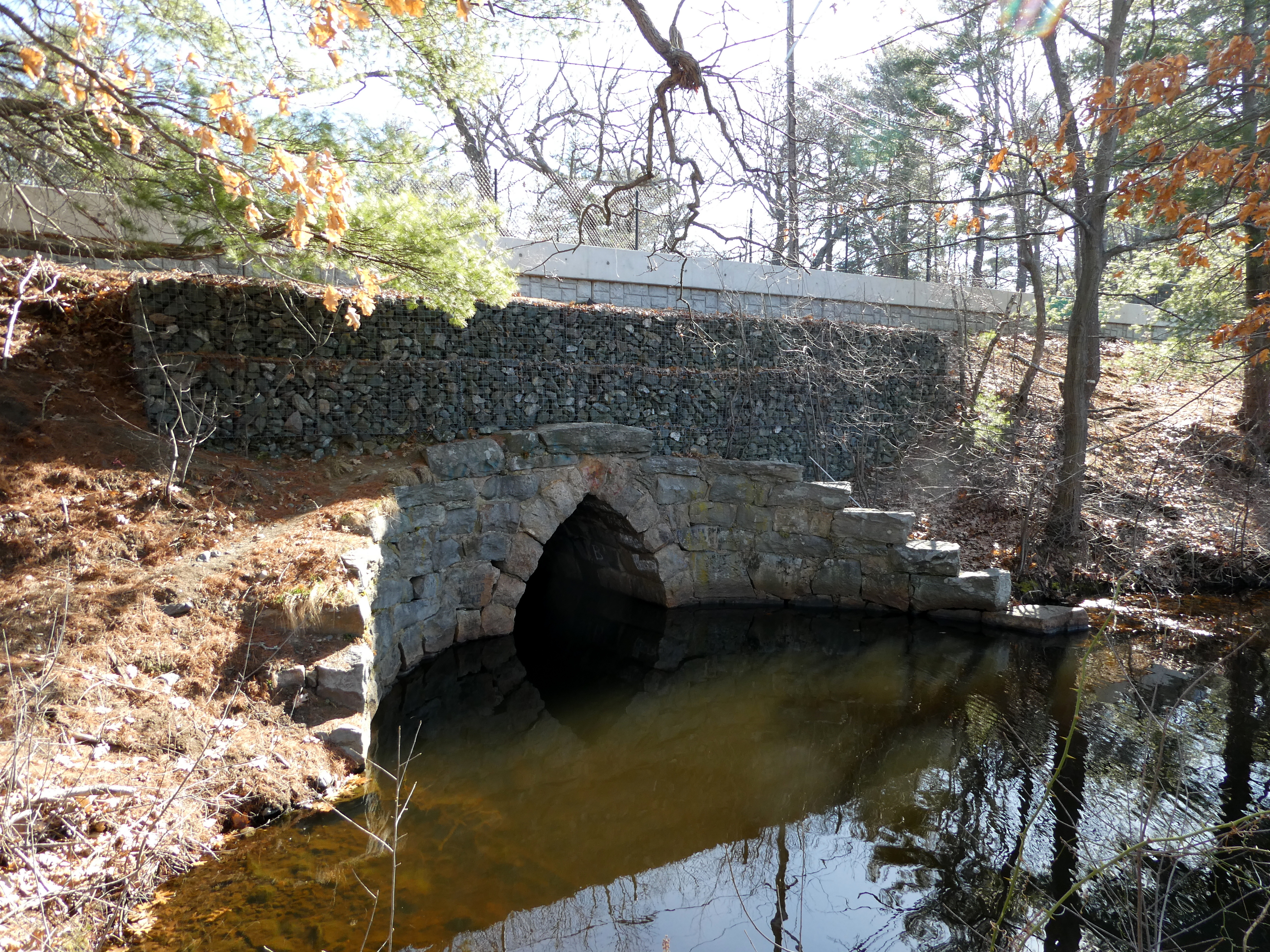
Keyhole arch bridge crossing Lake Cochituate in Natick

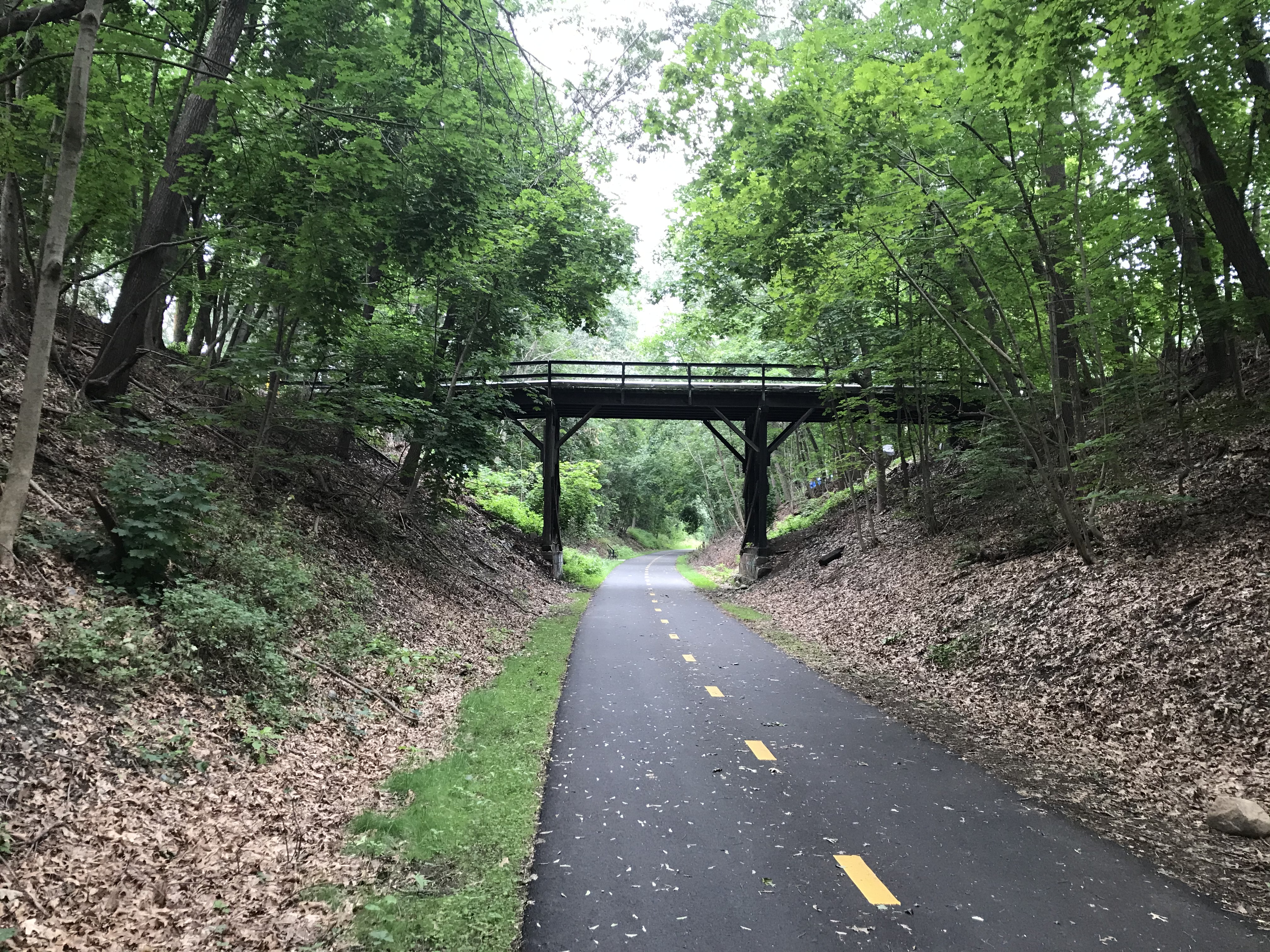
The CRT in Felchville running under the Loker Street pedestrian bridge

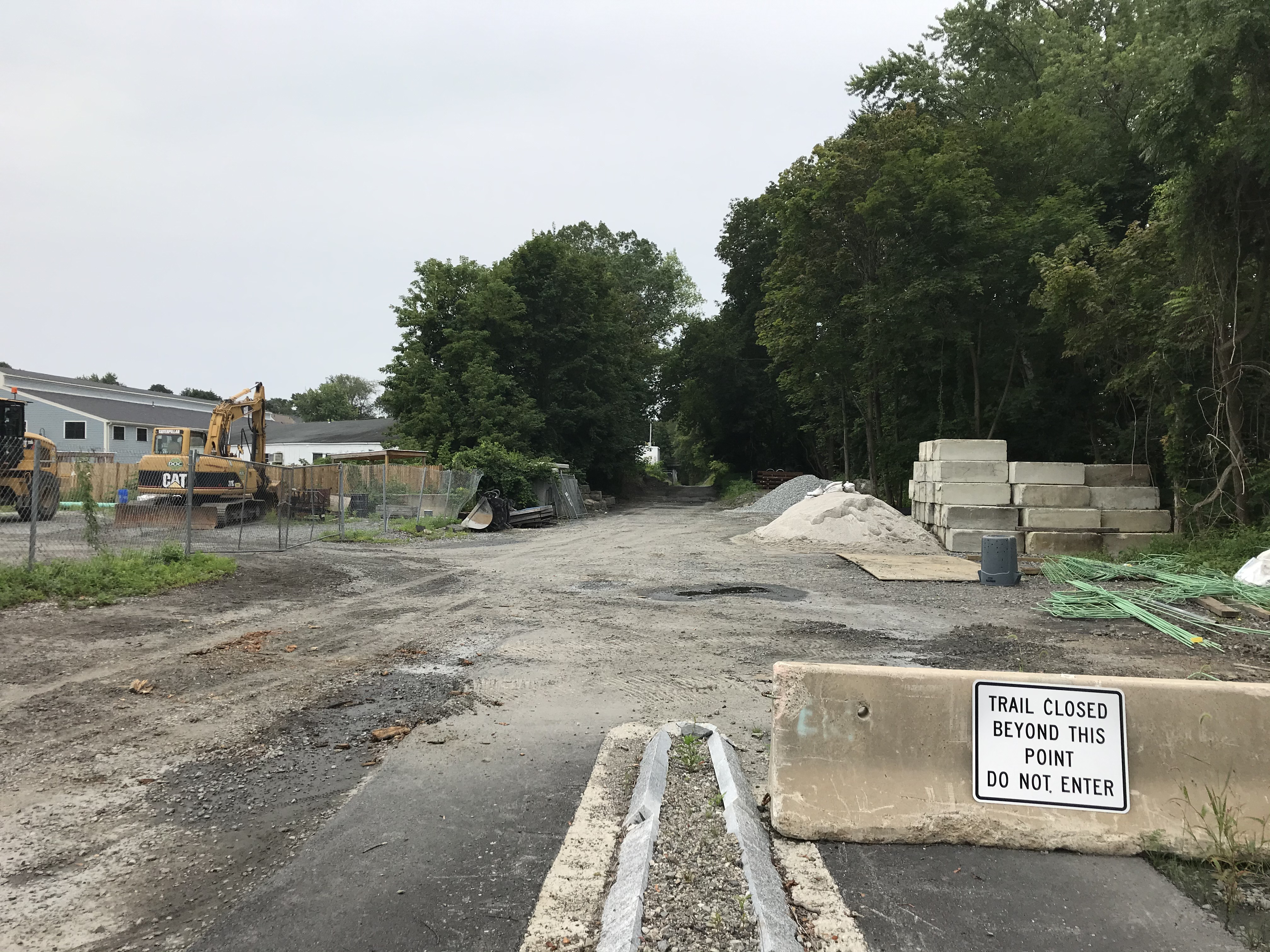
Construction heading towards Natick Center station
