= Beacon Hill Reservoir =

Former reservoir in Boston, Massachusetts

Coordinates: 42.3592°N 71.0639°W

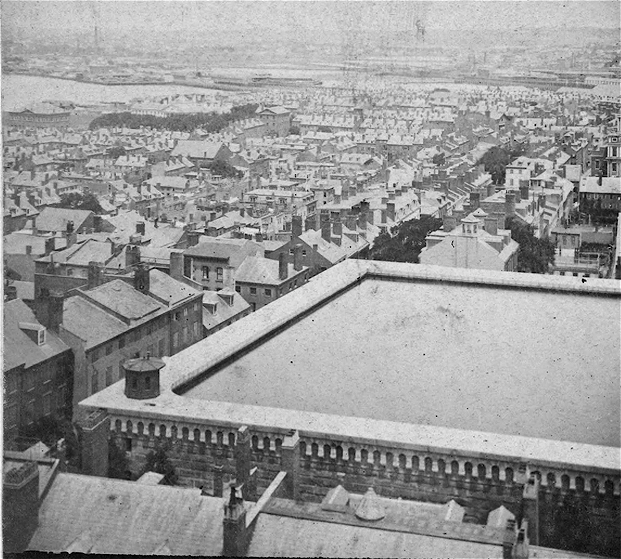
Beacon Hill Reservoir, with view of Beacon Hill and West End, Boston, 19th century

The Beacon Hill Reservoir (1849-c. 1880) in Boston, Massachusetts provided water to Beacon Hill from Lake Cochituate. It could hold 2.6 million US gallons (9,800 m^{3}). By 1876, the reservoir no longer distributed water, but rather functioned as a storage facility; it was dismantled in the early 1880s.

== History ==
The reservoir occupied a site on the top of Beacon Hill bounded by Derne Street, Hancock Street, Temple Street, and abutting residential lots along Mount Vernon Street. Construction began in 1847.

Planners scheduled a ceremony to lay the cornerstone at noon on November 13, 1847, "but at half past eleven, the ring at the head of the mast of the derrick to which the stone was suspended gave way, slightly injuring a little boy, and breaking the leg of a little girl, by the name of Frances Maria Hobbs, and doing considerable damage at the works. The laying of the stone was consequently postponed." One week later, the ceremony took place with presentations by Mayor Josiah Quincy, Rev. N. Adams, and a musical band; and government officials, contractors, and guests in attendance. "A copper box 12 inches square and 6 inches deep was deposited in the stone; it contained some of the publications of the day, the various reports on water, and 2 silver plates; on one was engraved the following inscription: 'The Water commissioners deposit this testimonial of respect for the memories of the late Loammi Baldwin, Martin Brimmer, Thomas A. Davis and Patrick T. Jackson, who severally rendered important assistance in promoting the adoption of the plans for a perpetual supply of pure water to the citizens of Boston.' On the other plate were engraved the names of the city government, water commissioners, water committee, engineers and contractors."

Two years later the building was complete. On the morning of November 23, 1849, "the water was let into it through the 30-inch pipe at half past nine o'clock ... and it was filled in 18½ hours." The reservoir "is built of the most massive description of stone masonry, and is the most costly distributing reservoir owned by the city. It covers about 37,012 square feet (3,438.5 m^{2}) of land, and has a mean horizontal water section of 28,014 square feet (2,602.6 m^{2}), and a capacity of 2,678,961 US gallons (10,140,970 L)."

By c. 1876, "owing to the connection of the Beacon Hill District with the High-Surface Pumping Works at Roxbury District, this reservoir is now used for storage, and is connected with the distributing pipes only in case of fire or accident to the pumping-mains." Use of the reservoir ended by c. 1880. In 1883, it "was demolished to build the addition at the rear of the State House." "The original cost of this property was over $500,000."

== See also ==
- Cochituate Aqueduct

== Images ==
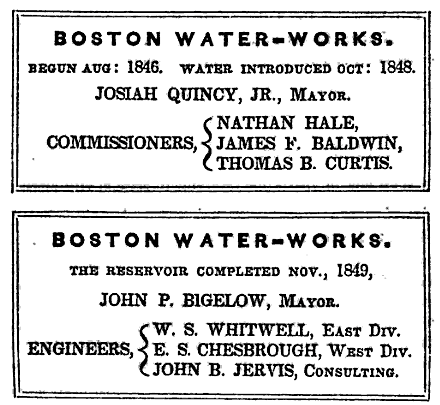
Renderings of tablets placed on the wall of the Beacon Hill Reservoir

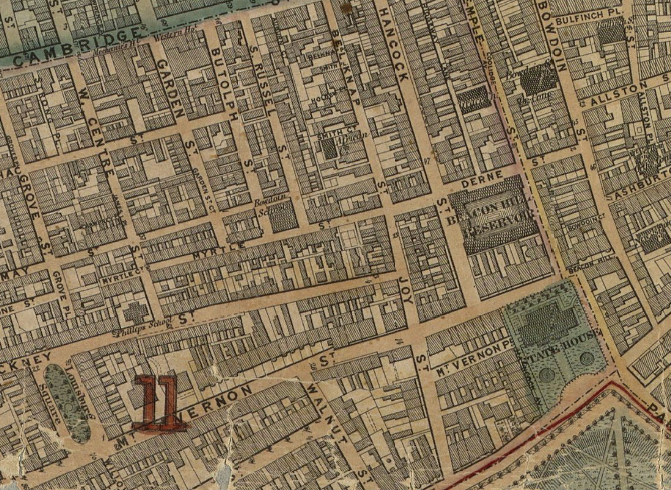
1852 map of Beacon Hill area, with location of reservoir

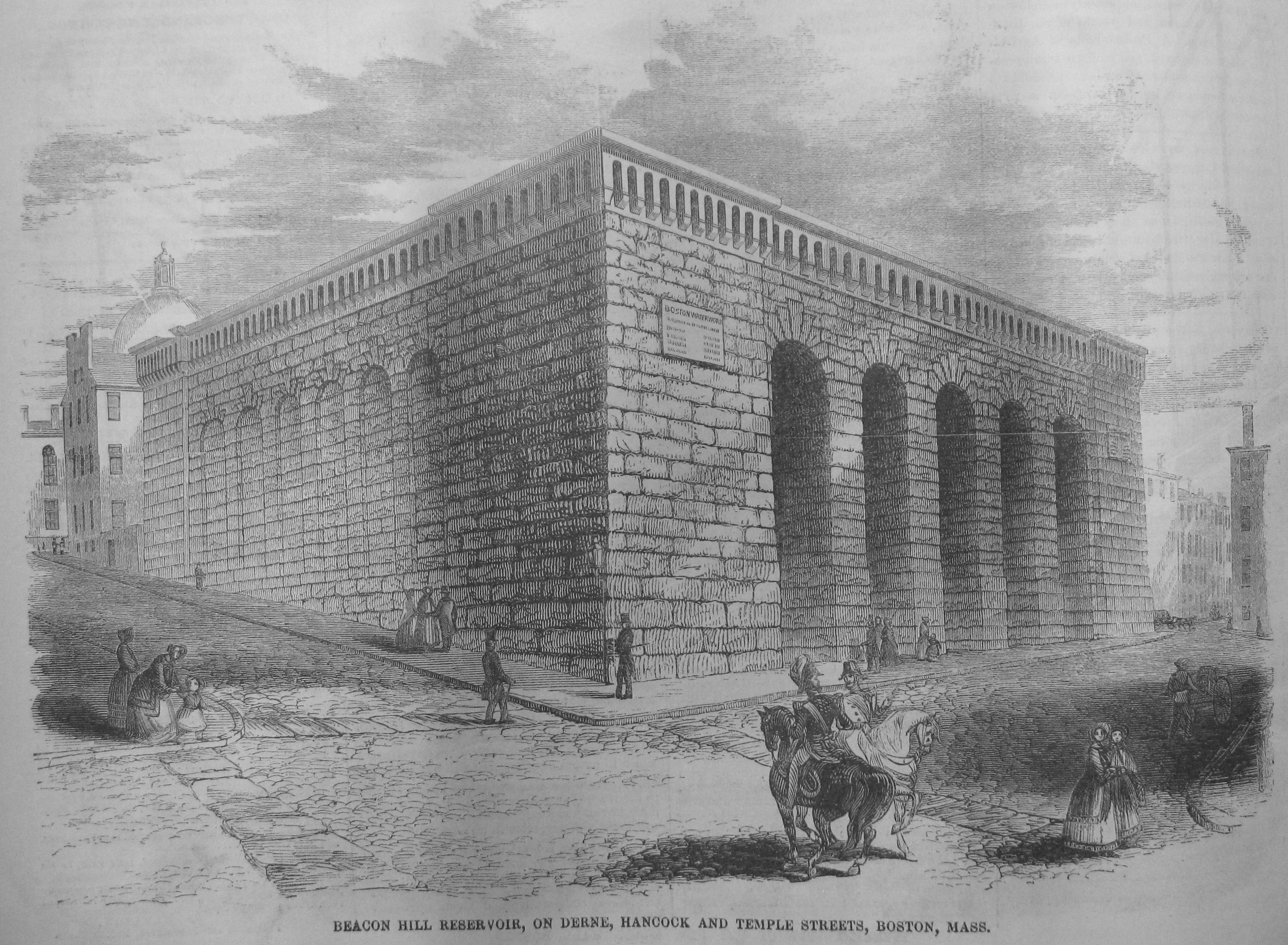
Illustration of reservoir, Gleasons Pictorial, 1852

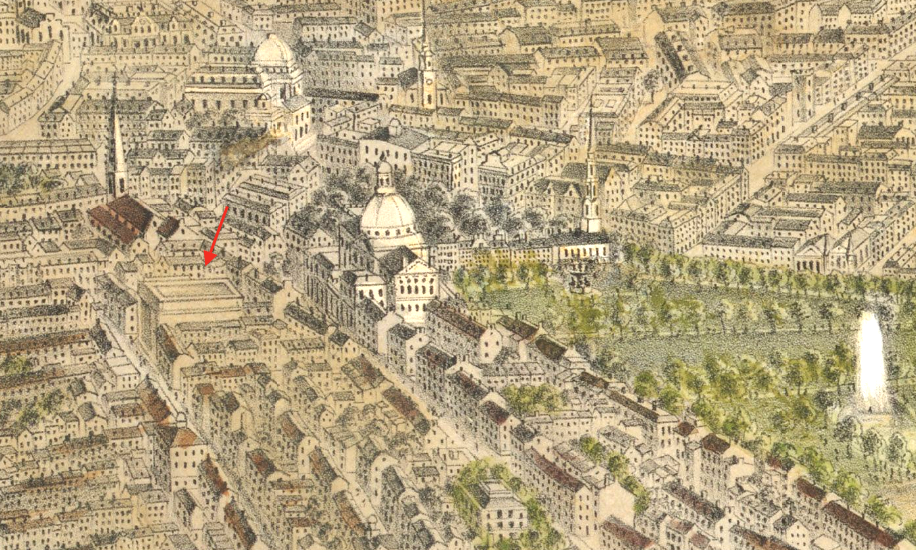
Overview of Beacon Hill, showing State House and reservoir, 1870

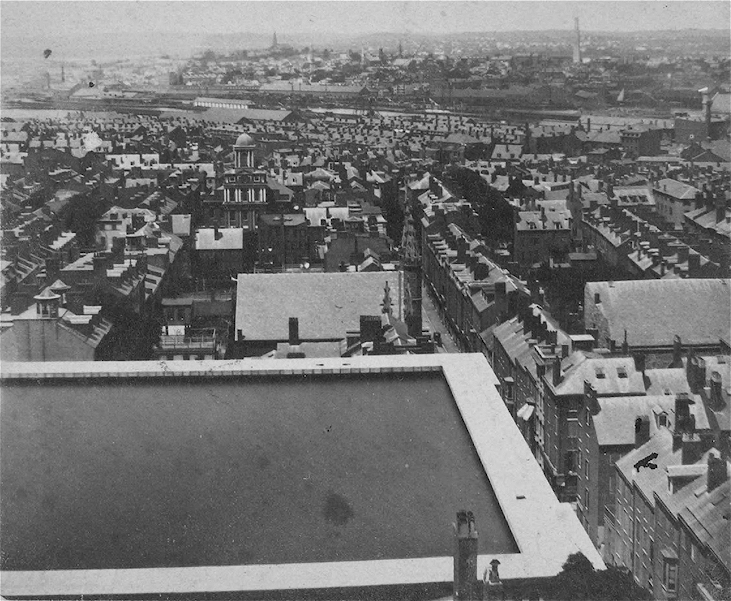
Overview of reservoir, Grace Church (at center), part of Beacon Hill and West End, 19th century
