= Reservoir Park (Massachusetts) =

Park in Brookline, Massachusetts

- U.S. National Register of Historic Places
- U.S. National Historic Landmark
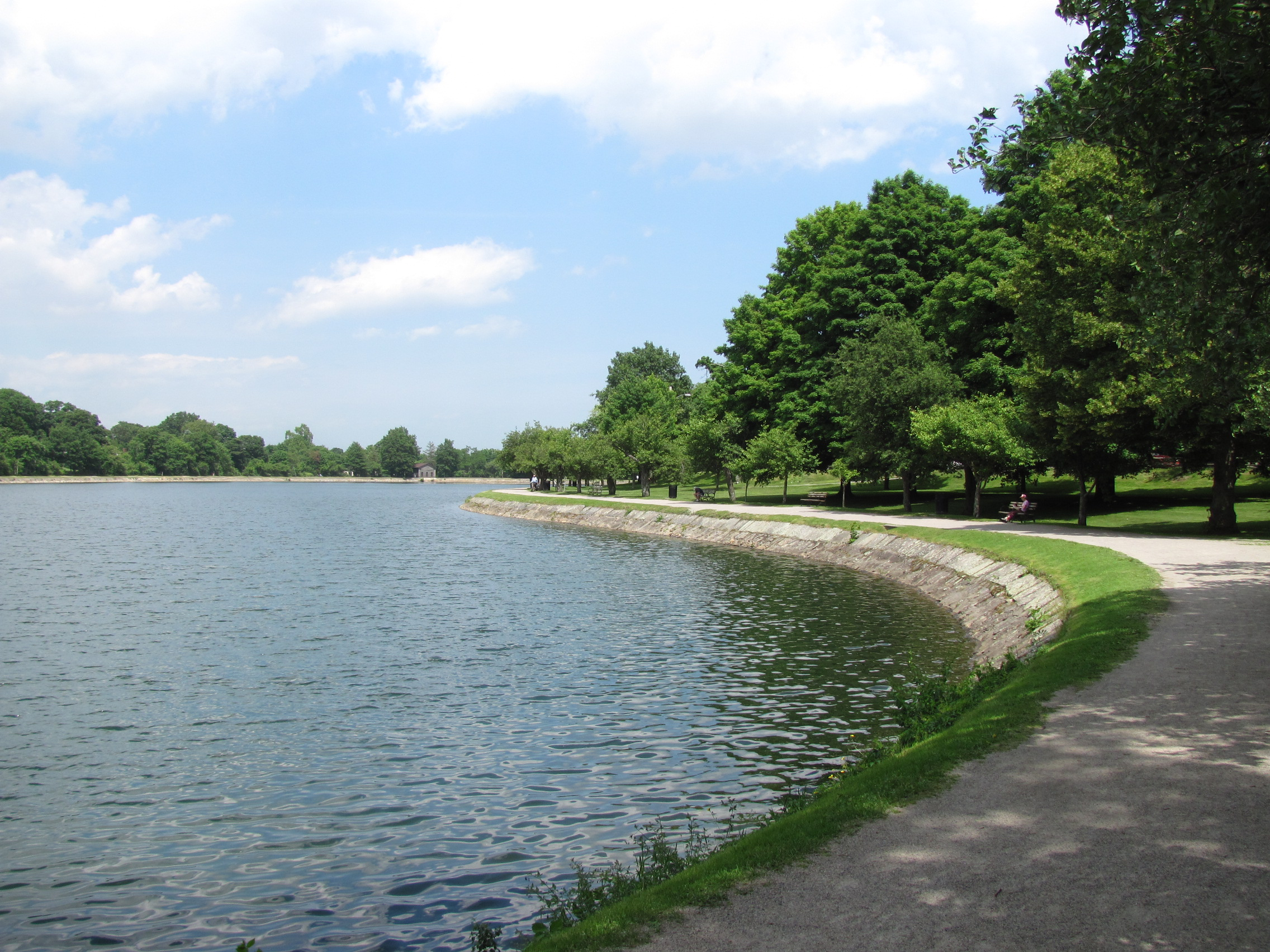
- Brookline Reservoir

- Location within Greater Boston area Location within Massachusetts Location within the United States
- Location: Boylston St., Brookline, Massachusetts
- Coordinates: 42°19′35″N 71°8′12″W
- Built: 1848
- Architect: City of Boston; French, Alexis
- MPS: Brookline MRA
- NRHP reference No.: 85003307, 15000278

Significant dates
- Added to NRHP: October 17, 1985
- Designated NHL: 2015-02-27

Reservoir Park is a historic park on Boylston Street in Brookline, Massachusetts. Its principal feature is Brookline Reservoir, formerly an element of the public water supply for neighboring Boston.

== History ==
The reservoir was built in 1848 as the main terminus of the now-defunct Cochituate Aqueduct, which delivered water from Lake Cochituate in the western suburbs.

The park was listed on the National Register of Historic Places in 1985. The architectural significance of the gatehouse and its status as the best-preserved element of the Cochituate Aqueduct were recognized in its designation as a National Historic Landmark in 2015.

== Structures ==
The reservoir covers 21.1 acres (8.5 ha), and is roughly kidney-shaped. A gravel path extends around the perimeter of the reservoir. The park is bounded on the north by Boylston Street (Massachusetts Route 9), on the west by Lee Street, on the south by Dudley Street, and on the east by Warren and Walnut Streets. There are two structures in the park: the Influent Gatehouse and the Principal Gatehouse.

=== Influent Gatehouse ===
At the western end of the reservoir stands the Influent Gatehouse, the endpoint of the Cochituate Aqueduct. This is a modest utilitarian structure built out of dressed granite, about 11 feet (3.4 m) by 12 feet (3.7 m) and 11 feet in height. Its interior houses equipment for managing the flow of water from the aqueduct into the reservoir.

=== Principal Gatehouse ===
The Principal Gatehouse, in contrast, is a more elaborate structure. It is located at the northeastern end of the reservoir, and is a two-story building partially buried in the embankment. It is built, like the Influent Gatehouse, of dressed granite, but was designed to be a public space. Its main facade has Renaissance Revival elements within a Greek-style temple front. The corners of the building have quoins in a paler shade of stone, and there is a course of that same stone in between the two floors. It has a gabled roof with a fully pedimented gable end, decorated with dentil stonework. The facade is three bays wide, with a centered entry on the lower level. The entry is recessed behind an arch that is flanked by round columns supporting an entablature. The entry is flanked by small elongated round-arch windows. The upper level consists of three larger equal-sized round-arch windows. The upper level of the building also has a facade facing the water; this also has three round-arch windows.

Because the Principal Gatehouse was intended as a public space, its interior was also finished, unlike that of the Influent Gatehouse. The walls were plastered, and there were stairs, constructed of wrought iron, which were used to reach a platform giving a view of the water. These staircases are believed to the oldest surviving example of wrought iron stairs intended for public use in the United States. (They are predated by surviving stairs in lighthouses and a prison, and by public stairs in other countries.) The building's roof is also believed to be the only surviving period roof supported by wrought iron trusses.

== See also ==
- List of National Historic Landmarks in Massachusetts
- National Register of Historic Places listings in Brookline, Massachusetts
