= Cochituate Aqueduct =

Aqueduct in Massachusetts (1848–1951)

Coordinates: 42.3262°N 71.2078°W

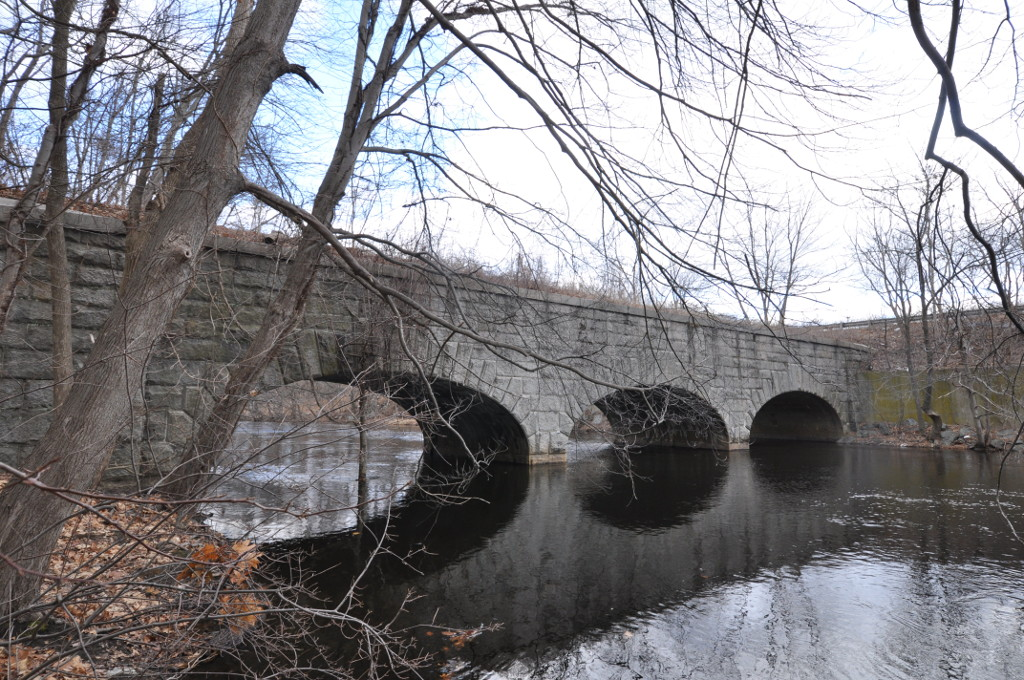
Bridge over the Charles River

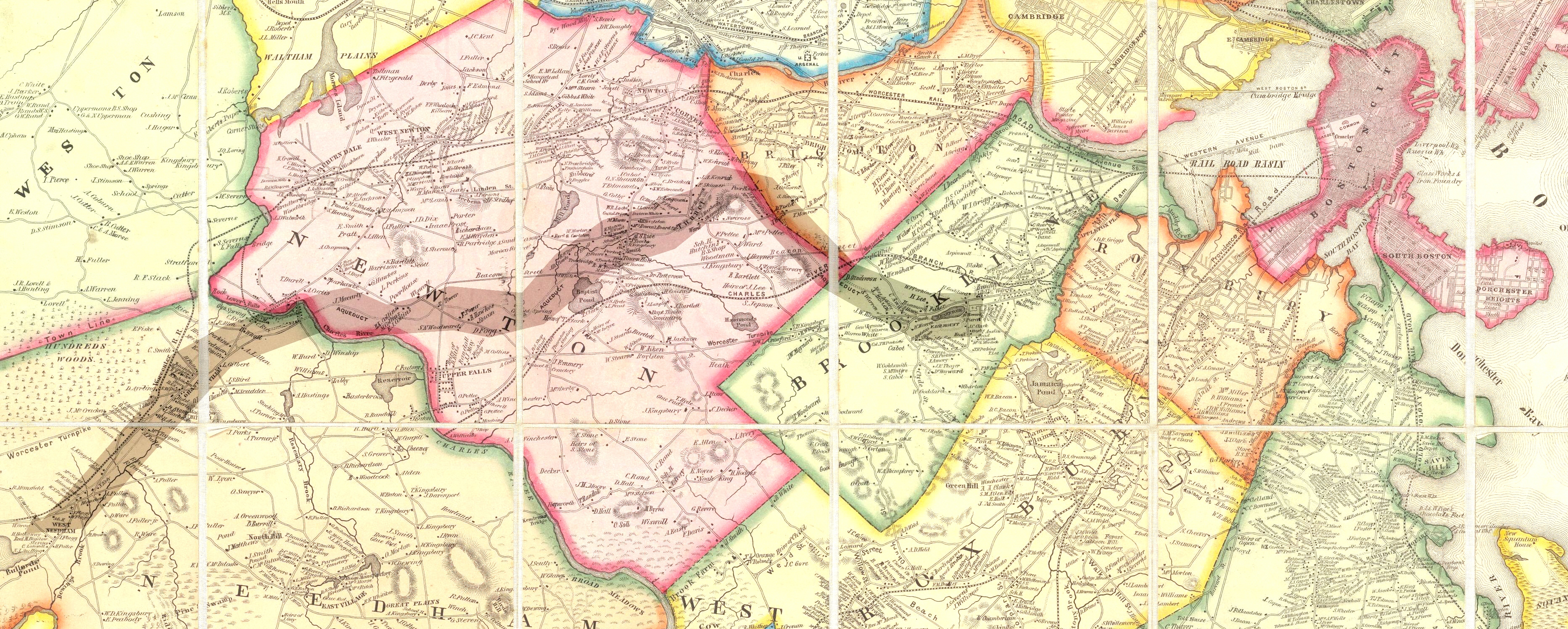
Cochituate Aqueduct map, 1852

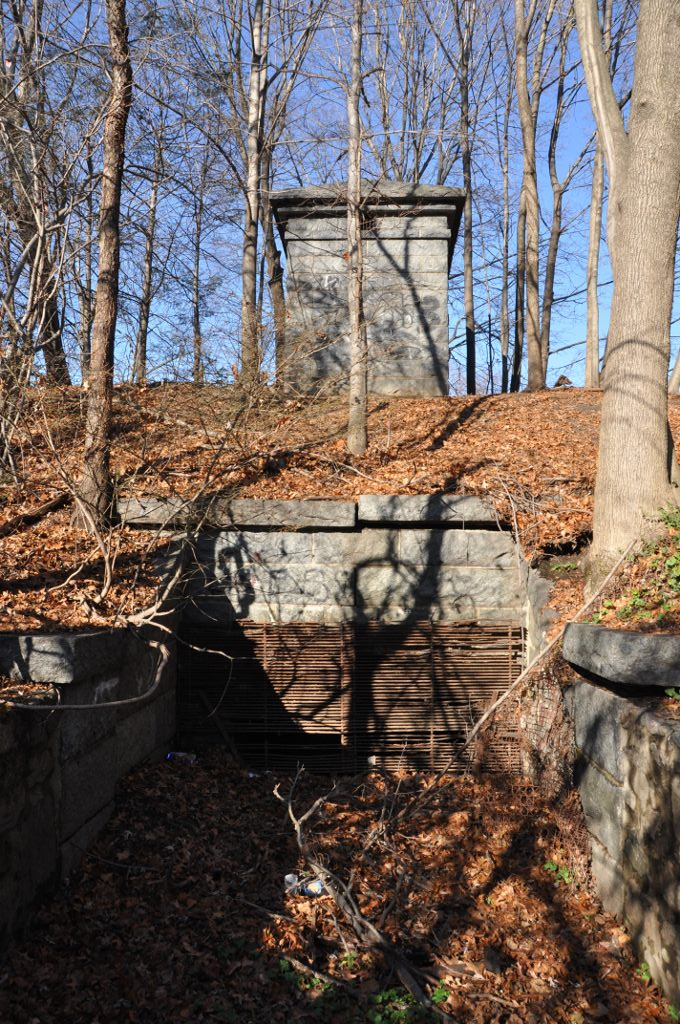
A waste weir and control house on the aqueduct in Newton

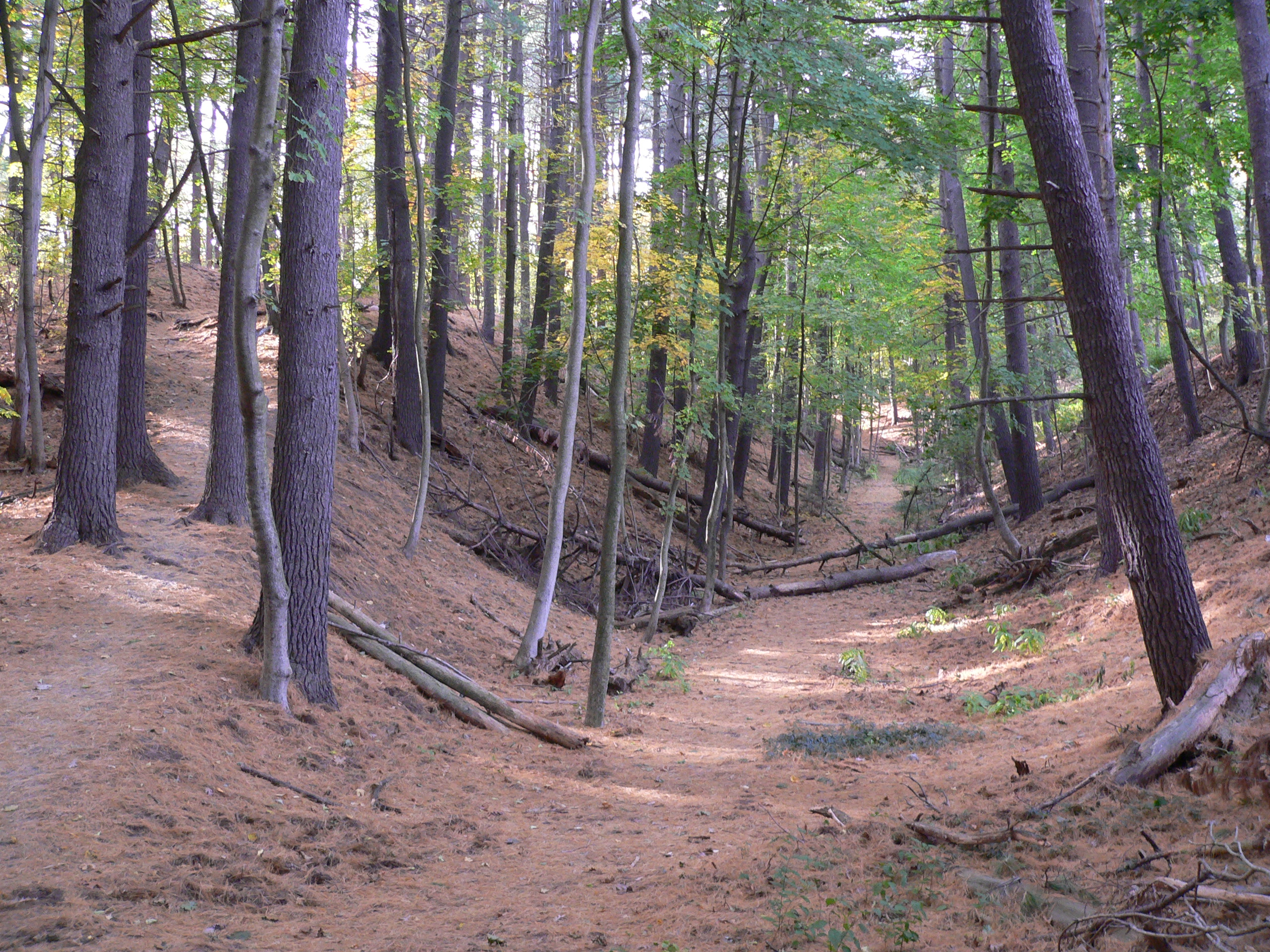
The site of the aqueduct in Newton

The Cochituate Aqueduct was an aqueduct in Massachusetts that brought water to Boston from 1848 to 1951.

== History ==
The aqueduct formed a key link in Boston's first major water supply system. Its genesis dates to 1845, when a Sudbury River tributary was impounded to form Lake Cochituate in Natick. The artificial lake, with 17 square miles (44 square kilometres) of watershed, 2 billion US gallons (7,600,000 m^{3}) of storage, and yield of 10 million US gallons (38,000 m^{3}) of water per day, became the cornerstone of Boston's public water system.

The aqueduct was built in 1846 to 1848 to convey water from Lake Cochituate to the Brookline Reservoir. Its route was 14 miles (23 km) long and passed through Natick, Wayland, Wellesley, Newton, and Brookline. From there, pipelines ran to small distribution reservoirs throughout Boston, including Beacon Hill Reservoir atop Beacon Hill. In 1848 Lake Cochituate's water first flowed into Frog Pond on Boston Common in a ceremony that drew 100,000 people.

By 1951, four major aqueducts were delivering water to Boston. The Cochituate system was unnecessary with its water declining in quality and requiring treatment. It was thus abandoned, and portions were purchased in 1952 by the City of Newton for sewer lines. It is now part of a trail system, with granite bridges and gatehouses still intact along its route.

In 2010, the Massachusetts Water Resources Authority issued a Use Permit to the Natick Conservation Commission for 16 acres (65,000 m^{2}) of the Natick section for future conservation and recreation purposes.

== Route ==
Portions of the aqueduct route have been overbuilt by roads and other construction, but it is in many areas still discernible.

The Cochituate Aqueduct begins at a gatehouse on the east side of Lake Cochituate, north of Massachusetts Route 30. It passes roughly eastward, eventually running along the town line between Wayland and Natick. It eventually turns southeasterly, skirting around the east side of Morses Pond in Wellesley shortly after passing under Massachusetts Route 9. It again turns east, passing north of Wellesley Town Hall before turning northeasterly through the Hunnewell Field athletic complex and toward Indian Spring Park, where it again turns east. It passes under Walnut and Cedar Streets in eastern Wellesley before descending to cross the Charles River into Newton on a stone bridge. There is a commemorative plaque in a small open park facing Cedar Street. The aqueduct crossing of the river is via an iron siphon tube, whose original control houses on both sides have been demolished.

In Newton, the aqueduct is located in the median dividing the lanes of Waban Avenue, and passes near the Waban MBTA station, before snaking through residential parts of Waban to skirt the southern edge of Cold Spring Park. It proceeds northeasterly to skirt the northern edge of the Newton Centre Playground, where the Sudbury Aqueduct runs along the playground's south side. It then loops northward around Prospect Hill before turning southeast, passing through the Boston College campus, where its route has been obliterated by St. Thomas More Road. It skirts the west side of Chestnut Hill Reservoir (whose construction it predates), before heading mainly southeast, paralleling Reservoir Road, to the western end of the Brookline Reservoir, where its end gatehouse is located.

== See also ==
- List of crossings of the Charles River
- Cochituate standpipe
