= Dug Pond =

Lake in Massachusetts, United States

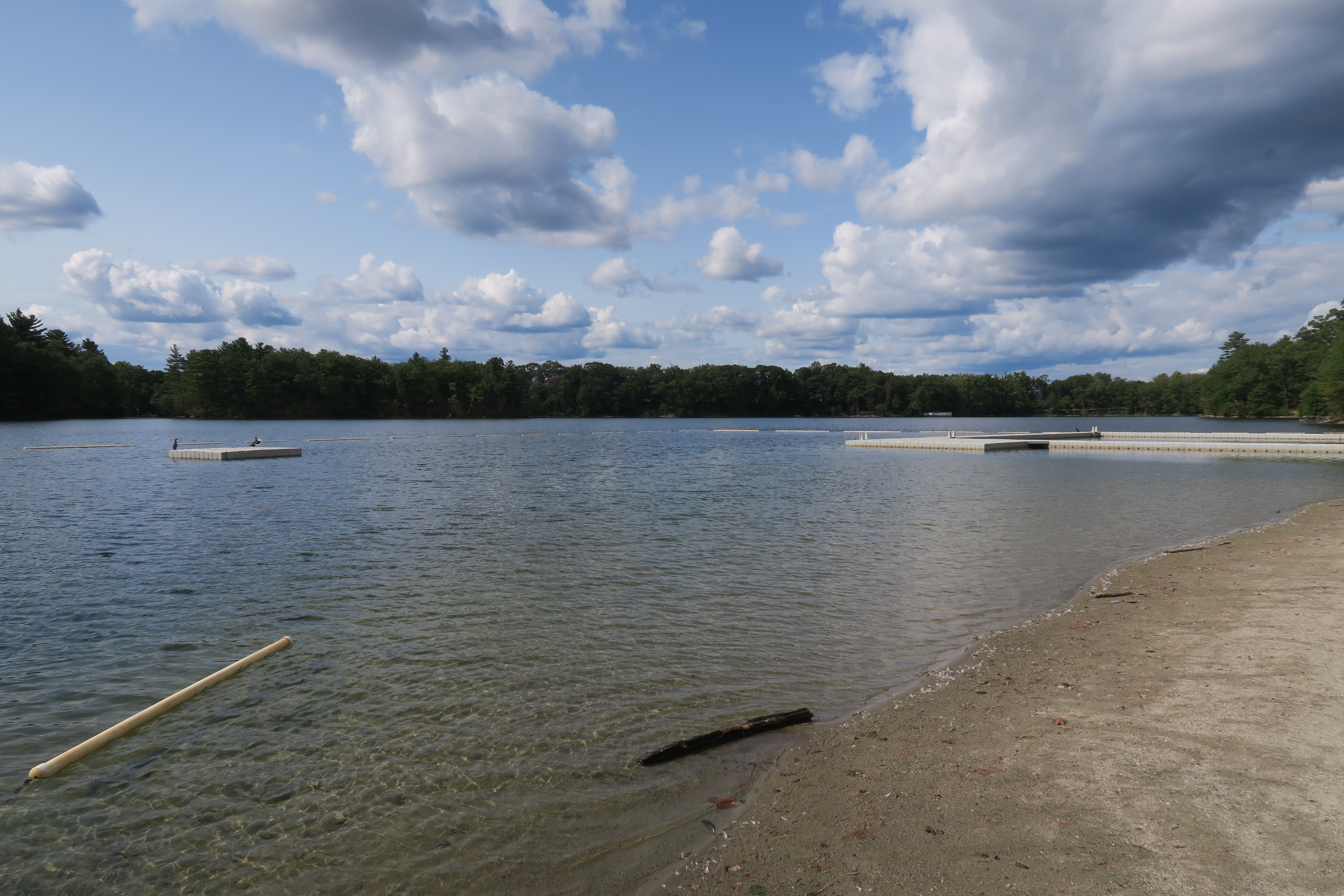
- Photo of Dug Pond, taken from Memorial Beach.

- Location within Massachusetts Location within the United States
- Location: Natick, Massachusetts
- Coordinates: 42°16′35″N 71°21′55″W
- Primary outflows: Streams to Charles River
- Basin countries: United States
- Surface area: 48 acres (19.42 ha)
- Average depth: 15 ft (5 m)
- Max. depth: 45 ft (14 m)
- Surface elevation: 148 ft (45 m)
- Islands: One (Bean Island)

Dug Pond is a small body of water in Natick, Massachusetts. Most notably it is home to Memorial Beach, one of few swimming beaches in Natick, and Bean Island, an uninhabited island in the western part of the lake. Its eastern shore is the site of Natick High School.

== Uses ==
Memorial Beach is used in the summer for swimmers on day and season passes boasting a picnic area, snack bar, small playground, floating dock, and a separate platform with a diving board. A small building contains showers, bathrooms, and a changing area. The beach is also the start and finish of the swimming leg of the Natick Mini Triathlon. Swimming in the rest of the pond is not as common but is done by swimmers who are in need of larger areas. The Town of Natick employs lifeguards, mostly college and high school students.

The pond also has a recently renovated boat ramp located on the south side, suitable for canoes and car-top boats, which is used mainly for small fishing boats and also the fleet belonging to the Natick High School Sailing Team.

Fishing for pleasure (including ice fishing) is also relatively common, mainly on the northern shore where there are several fishing areas with dirt paths leading to Pond Street, and on the southern shore near the boat ramp. Rainbow trout, brown trout, brook trout, largemouth bass, chain pickerels, bluegills, pumpkinseeds, brown bullheads, carp, eels, perch, and golden shiners are all relatively common. A type of freshwater hydrozoan, Craspedacusta sowerbyi, can also be found in the pond.

The pond is also used by diving teams of the Natick Police and Fire Departments for practice rescue drills in both summer and winter, generally along the north shore.

== Geography ==
A photograph of Bean Island, taken from the northern coast of Dug Pond.

Dug Pond is a typical New England pond with one island, 48 acres (19.42 ha) in area, with depth reaching a maximum of 45 feet (14 m) and averaging 15 ft (5 m). The pond's transparency is relatively good and it has sparse aquatic vegetation. It has a rocky sandbar near the center on which the depth is close to 3 feet (1 m), but for the most part the pond follows standard depth patterns. Generally, excluding the beach and the boat launch, the pond has steep dirt shores with trees growing close to the water. In winter, it is usually covered completely by ice and is often safe to walk on for months.

The pond has one significant wooded island, named Bean Island, which rises 21 feet above the pond at its highest and is approximately 100,000 square feet (9,300 m^{2}) in area. The island is located near the pond's western shore. It can be accessed by boat or by wading through the waist deep water of Fiddlum's Strait, which is reached from trails leading off Lakeview Ave. The island has semi steep slopes from the water to the top of the island where there is a depression that contains the remains of an old fire. There was a rope swing on the east side of Bean Island, with a drop-off shortly after the shoreline. The tree it was attached to fell down in late 2024 after woodpeckers damaged it. There is now one makeshift swing to the south of the original. It is important to wear footwear while on the island as there is a lot of broken glass littering the ground.

Bean Island is uninhabited and is home to one major trail that runs the perimeter of the island. There are smaller, unmapped trails leading inland.

A trail map of Bean Island.

In the northeast corner of the pond is a small area of wetlands, where the stream that feeds the pond enters. (The stream leaves the pond near the boat ramp on the south side.)

The dip in Pond Street on Dug Pond's northern shore represents a significant split in water flow. All runoff to the north of Pond Street eventually runs (by way of Lake Cochituate) into the Sudbury River, which enters the Merrimack before reaching the Atlantic. All runoff south of Pond Street, including the outflow of Dug Pond itself, drains to the Charles River and eventually Boston Harbor.

== Namesakes ==
Dug Pond is known for the seemingly strange names of the geographical features involving it. The origins of the names of these features are as listed below:

- Dug Pond: This moniker was given to the pond due to the local legend that the pond was excavated (dug) for use as a pasture but got flooded with rainwater. This legend is false, as Dug Pond is a naturally formed glacier body. The pond was originally called Lake Monsemog by native people.
- Bean Island: The island within the lake is named Bean Island to honor the use of the surrounding land as a bean farm by indigenous peoples (mainly the Nipmuc) before the colonial era.
- Fiddlum's Strait: This thin strait separates the southwestern coast of the island from the nearby forest trails off of Lakeview Ave. It is about 96 feet across (around the same width as the distance between baseball bases) and 3 feet deep at its deepest, making it easy to walk across to access the island. The channel is named Fiddlum's Strait in memory of local man and ice cream vendor Barney Fiddlum Sr., who became the first to cross the strait and subsequently the first to reach the island in 1897.

== Cultural significance ==
According to local myth, the pond itself was supposedly excavated from level ground and intended to be used as a pasture for animals, but filled with rainwater, hence the name "Dug Pond." It was the steep slope of the shores that led townspeople to guess it was a man-made pond, which is false, as the pond was naturally created by glaciers.

One interesting cultural feature is a flat wall of concrete about five by twenty feet on the northwest shore, which is accessible by trails from above and by wading from below. This is the leftover foundation of an old icehouse. It is known to Natick High School students simply as "The Wall," and because it is directly visible across the pond from many rooms of NHS, it is the site of constantly changing graffiti, mainly by members of each high school senior class.

By road, the distance around the pond is 1.86 miles, or almost exactly 3 km. Running this route starting at or near the high school is known as "running the pond," and is often a part of the tryouts for high school sports teams, where the potential team members must finish the pond running, but generally not under any time limit.

Dug Pond is also the source of the name for the relatively significant road Pond Street, which runs parallel to Route 135 from downtown Natick to Speen Street.
