= Grace Church (Boston) =

Episcopal church in Boston, Massachusetts

Coordinates: 42°21′34.58″N 71°3′48.43″W

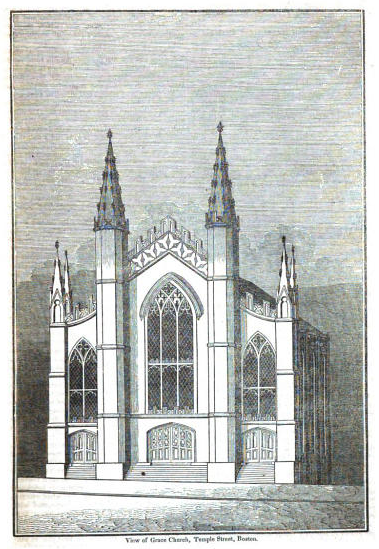
Grace Church, Temple St., Boston, 1836

Grace Church (1835–1865) was an Episcopal church in Boston, Massachusetts, located in Beacon Hill, on Temple Street. The church operated for 30 years. Ministers included Thomas M. Clark (1836–1843); Clement Moore Butler (1844–1847); and Charles Mason (1848–1862; d.1862).

Architect William Washburn designed the church building in 1835. In 1851, Isaac Smith Homans said:

The interior is beautifully painted by M. Bragaldi. The exterior of the building, including the towers (which are of the octagonal form), is 87 feet; breadth 68 feet. The basement is divided into 2 large rooms for lectures, Sunday-schools, &c. The height from the main floor above the basement to the centre of the main arch, is 45 feet; an arch is thrown over each of the side galleries, which is intersected by arches opposite the three windows on each side, and resting on each side upon four cluster columns of 24 inches diameter.

In 1865 the building was "sold to the Methodist Episcopal Society of North Russell Street."

== Image gallery ==
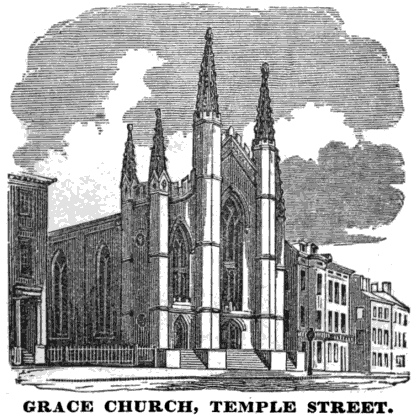
Grace Church, c. 1851

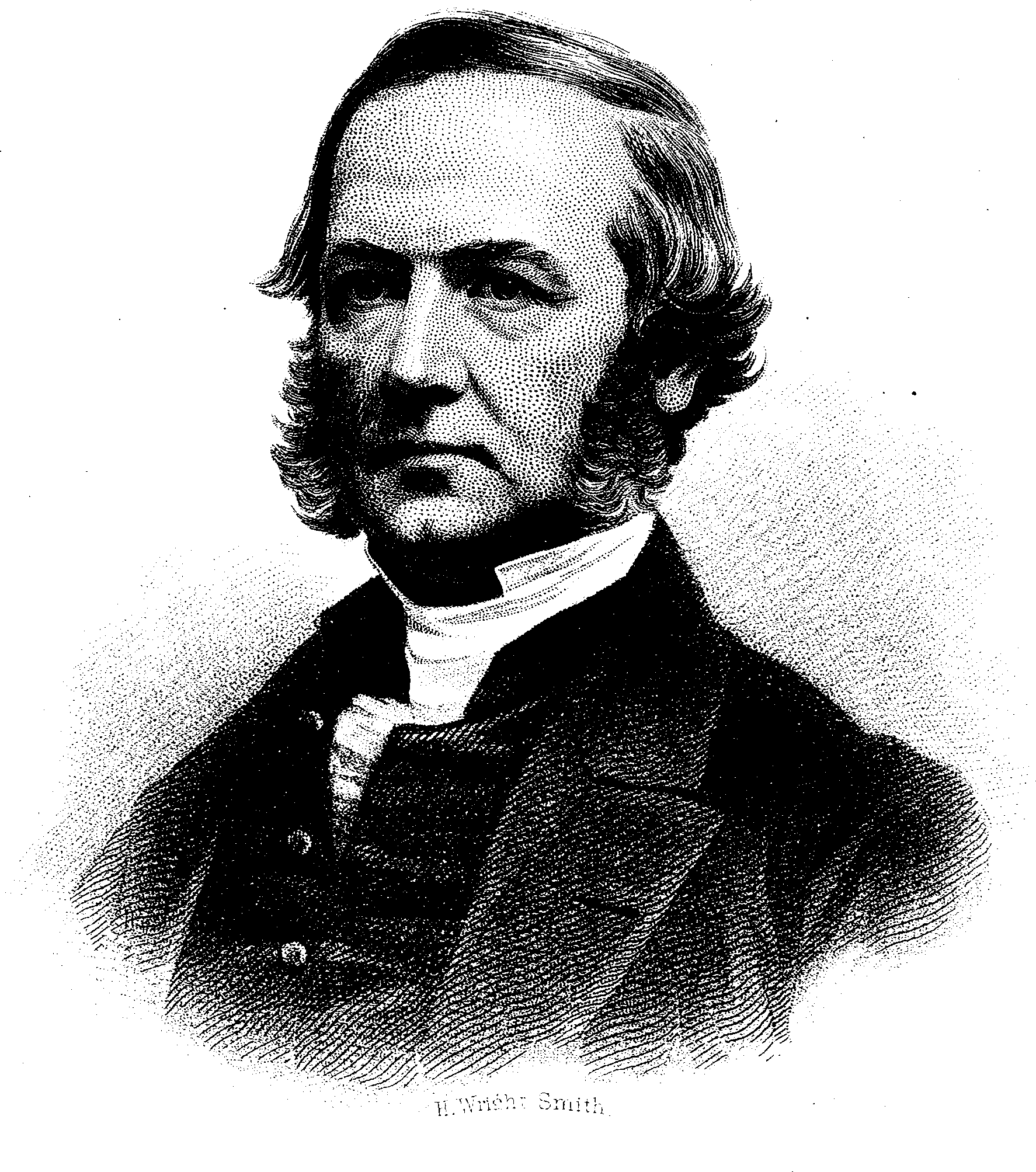
Portrait of Charles Mason, minister 1848-1862

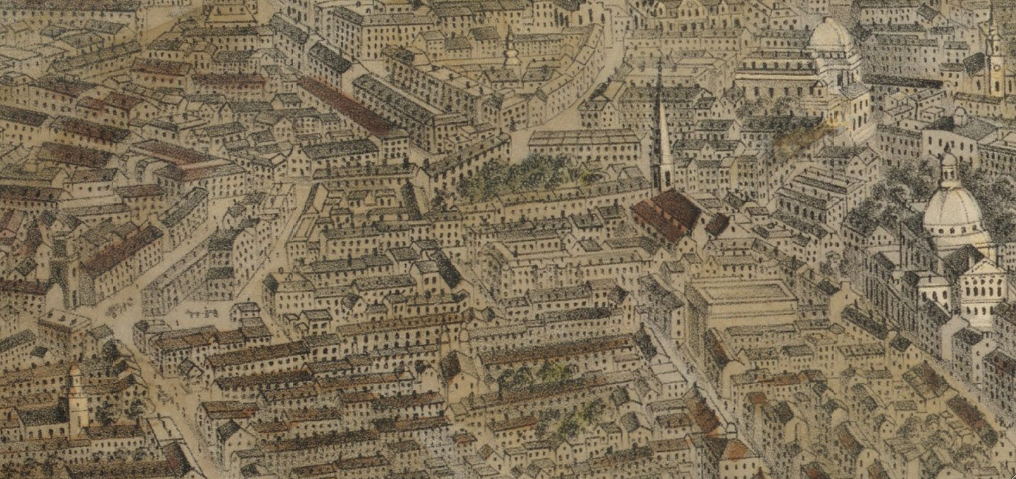
Overview of Temple Street, 1870. Beacon Hill Reservoir (at right), West Church (at left)

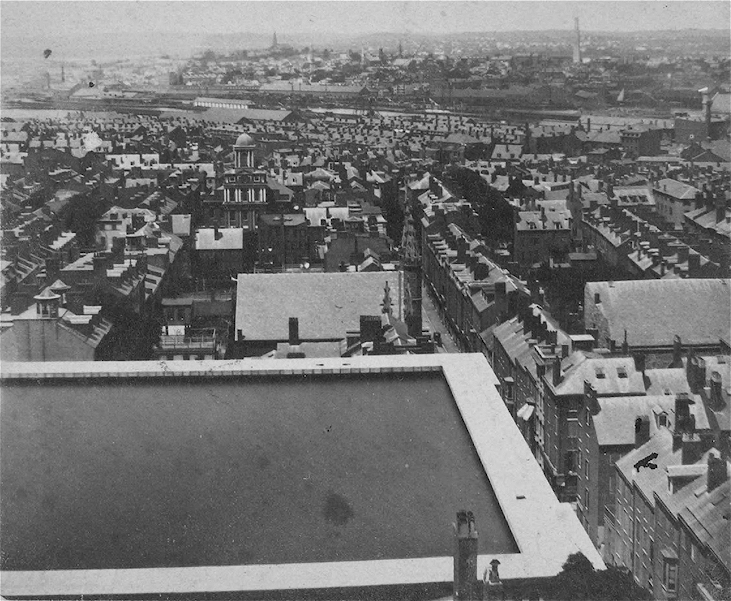
Overview of reservoir, Grace Church (at center), part of Beacon Hill and West End, 19th century
