= Felchville, Massachusetts =

Populated place in Massachusetts, United States

Coordinates: 42°17′52″N 71°21′33″W

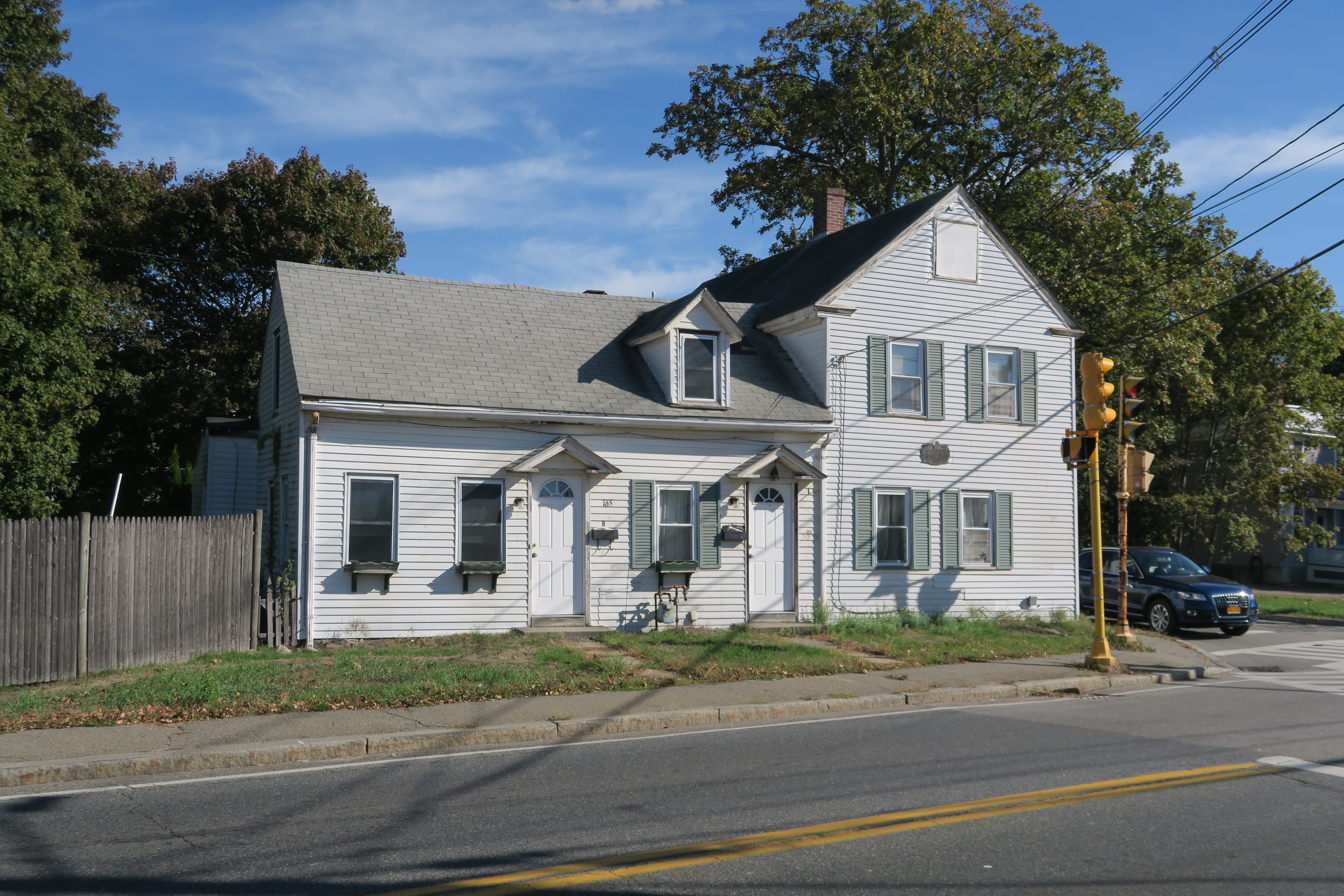
Isaac Felch House

Felchville is a populated place in Natick, Middlesex County, Massachusetts, United States.

== History ==
A factory was established at Felchville in the 1850s by the Felch brothers.
