= Cochituate State Park =

State park in Massachusetts, United States

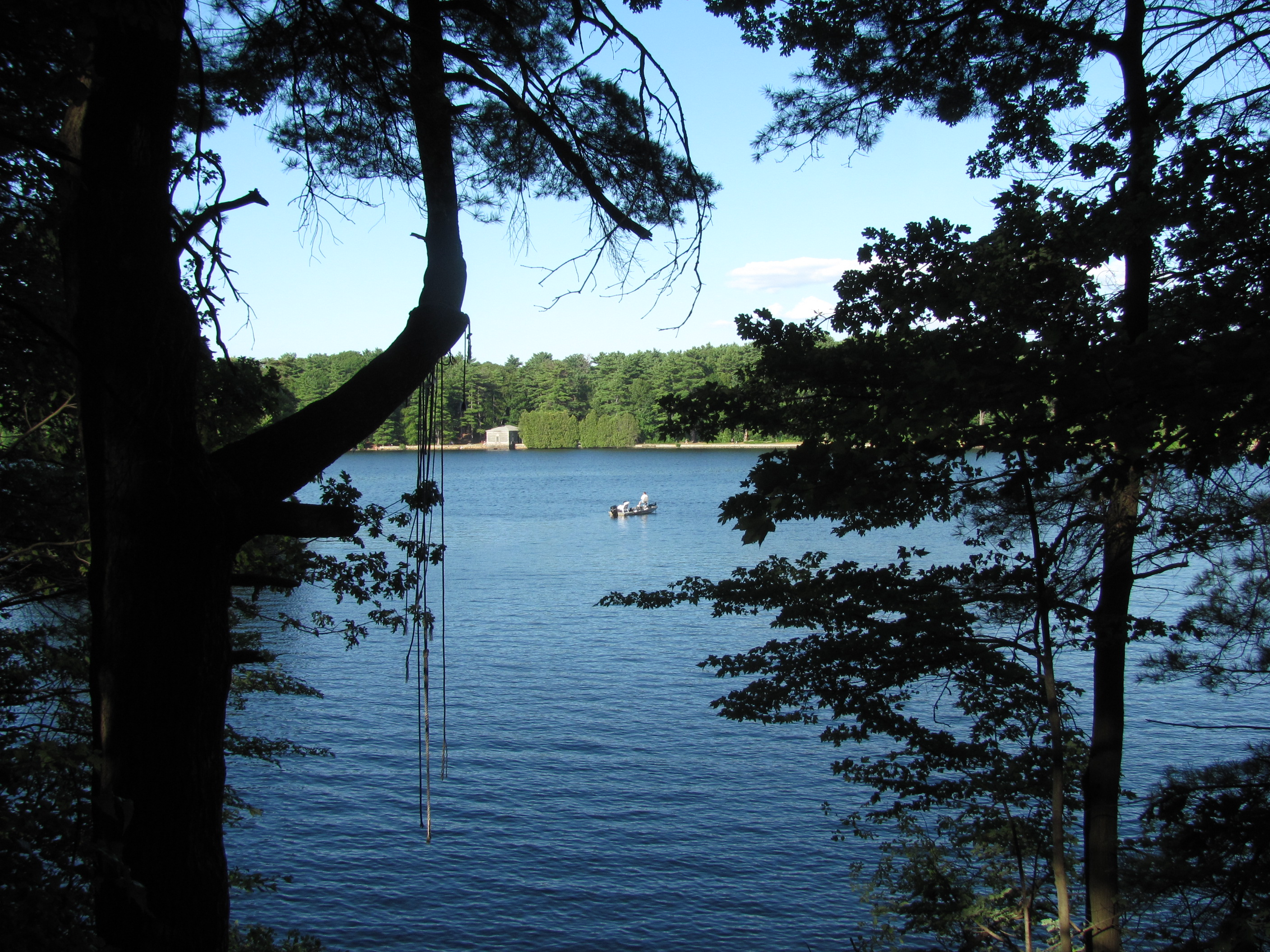

- Location within Massachusetts Location within the United States
- Interactive map of Cochituate State Park
- Location: Natick, Massachusetts, United States
- Coordinates: 42°19′08″N 71°22′41″W
- Area: 872 acres (353 ha)
- Elevation: 138 ft (42 m)
- Administrator: Massachusetts Department of Conservation and Recreation
- Website: Official website

Cochituate State Park is a Massachusetts day-use state park located on Lake Cochituate in the town of Natick. The park is managed by the Department of Conservation and Recreation.

== Activities and amenities ==
The park offers motor boating, sailing, canoeing, kayaking, windsurfing, fishing, picnicking, and swimming. The park encompasses three sections of Lake Cochituate called the North, Middle and South lakes with different restrictions applying to each. Boat rentals are available in summer. The scenic Snake Brook Trail is used for hiking and biking year-round. The South Lake is host to Wellesley High School, Wayland High School, and Lincoln-Sudbury Regional High School sailing teams from March through May.
