= Lake Cochituate =

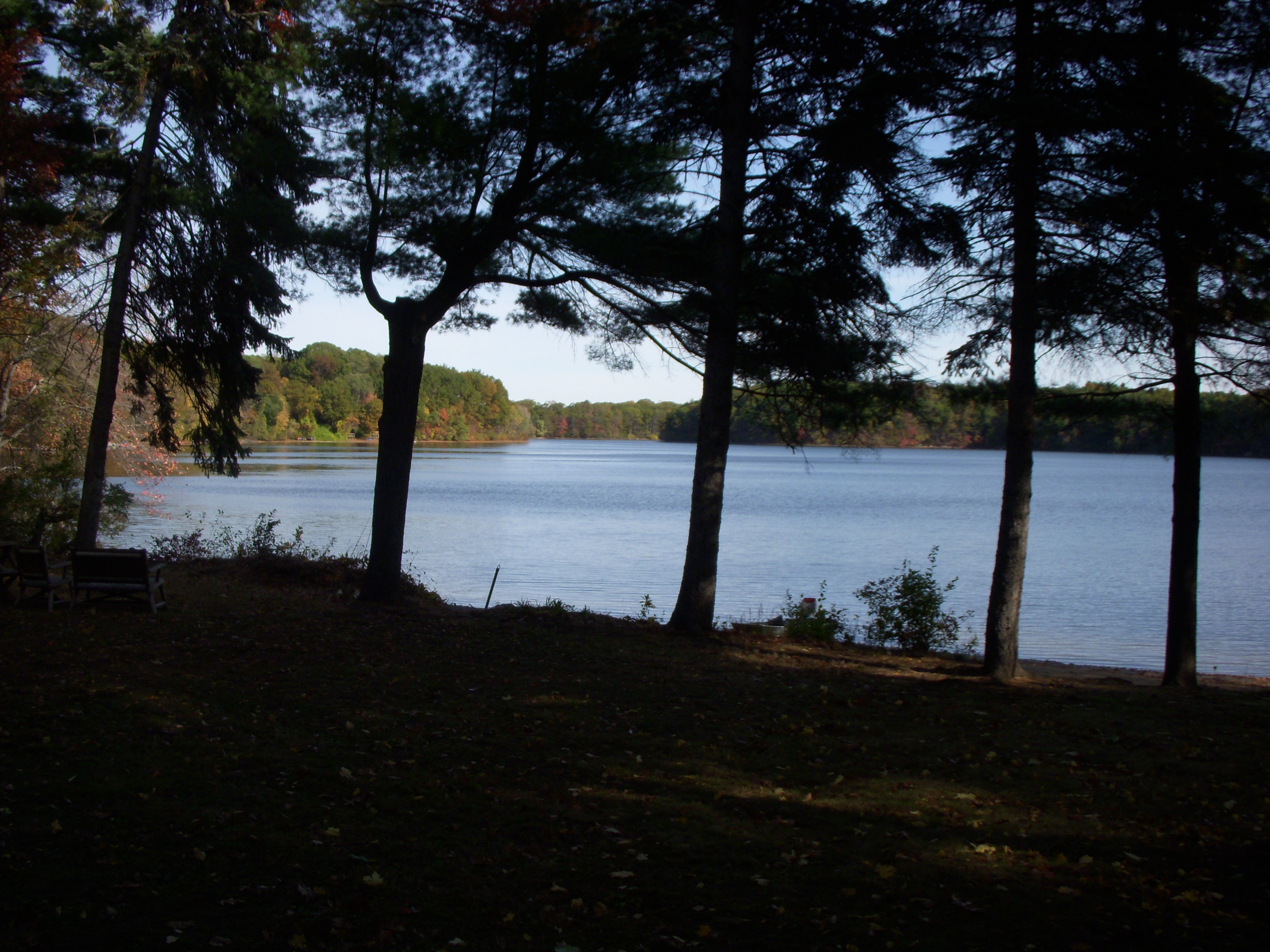
- South Pond

- Location within Massachusetts Location within the United States
- Location: Middlesex County, Massachusetts
- Coordinates: 42.3189879°N 71.3781509°W
- Type: Reservoir
- Catchment area: 17 sq mi (44 km^{2})
- Basin countries: United States
- Max. length: 3.76 mi (6.05 km)
- Surface area: 625 acres (2.53 km^{2})
- Surface elevation: 154 ft (47 m)
- Settlements: Natick, Wayland, Framingham

Lake Cochituate is an impounded body of water in the municipalities of Natick, Wayland, and Framingham in Massachusetts, United States. Originally built to supply water to Boston, it no longer serves that function, and is now a local recreational resource and home to Cochituate State Park.

== Description ==
Lake Cochituate consists of three linked ponds known as North Pond, Middle Pond, and South Pond. A large peninsula in South Pond is the site of the US Army Soldier Systems Center (SSC), and the eastern shore holds the trails of Pegan Cove Park. Middle Pond is home to Cochituate State Park, which includes boat ramps and a picnic area. North Pond is the site of both Wayland Town Beach and Saxonville Beach of Framingham.

On the edge of Middle Pond is the new MathWorks Lakeside campus. This building was originally a Carling brewery, built in 1957. The former Saxonville Industrial Track runs alongside sections of the lake, which brought supplies to both the Carling Brewery, the ITT Continental Bakery, and a Green Stamps warehouse located on the edge of the lake in an area formerly called an industrial park. The Cochituate Rail Trail runs along the lake on the former track's right-of-way, from downtown Natick to Saxonville, a section of Framingham.

The three ponds and their connector ponds cover a total of 625 acres (2.53 km^{2}). South of Cochituate, the 40-acre (160,000 m^{2}) Dug Pond is the site of Natick High School. The Lake Cochituate watershed, part of the Sudbury River watershed, encompasses 17 square miles (44 km^{2}) in Natick, Wayland, Framingham, Ashland, and Sherborn. This in turn is part of the Concord River and Merrimack River watersheds. Cochituate is also the name of a village in Wayland.

In 2005, a severe thunderstorm occurred that produced a violent microburst that knocked down dozens of trees and injured some visitors, according to the Massachusetts Department of Conservation and Recreation. Two teens, Ahmie Harman and Valeria Barbier, had a tree fall on them, while another teen, Oliver Barbier, was caught in the lightning storm. Though sustaining injuries, all soon recovered. A memorial plaque, in witness of the event, has been placed there to remember them and others who survived the storm.

== History ==
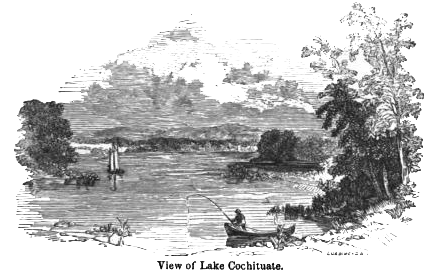
Lake Cochituate circa 1847

Lake Cochituate was created by the construction of Lake Cochituate Dam to provide a reservoir for water supply to the city of Boston, via the 14-mile (23 km) Cochituate Aqueduct. Lake Cochituate was the first major water supply system built for the city, and replaced the previous usage of Jamaica Pond. Developed from 1848 to 1863, it supplied Boston's water until 1951, by which time it had been supplanted by the larger Wachusett and Quabbin Reservoir supplies. The surveys and plans for the project were performed by civil engineer James Fowle Baldwin (1782–1862), the son of Loammi Baldwin who designed the Middlesex Canal, and younger brother of Loammi Baldwin Jr. (1780–1838) who authored the earlier studies for a Boston water supply. Its 1890 dam, replacing two older dams on the lake's northwestern outlet, is listed on the National Register of Historic Places. The former gatehouse for the Cochituate Aqueduct is located on the east side of the lake.
