= Mary-Averett Seelye =

American performer (1919–2013)

- Mary-Averett Seelye, from a 1958 magazine
- Born: March 11, 1919; Chatham, New Jersey, US
- Died: March 30, 2013 (aged 94); Mitchellville, Maryland, US
- Occupation(s): Performance artist, dancer, theatre professional
- Relatives: Talcott Williams Seelye (brother); Dorothea Seelye Franck (sister); Kate Seelye (niece); Julius Hawley Seelye (great-grandfather)

Mary-Averett Seelye (March 11, 1919 – March 30, 2013) was an American performance artist, dancer, actress, choreographer, and director.

== Early life and education ==
Seelye was born in Chatham, New Jersey, the daughter of Laurens H. Seelye and Kate Chambers Seelye. She was raised in Beirut, where her father was a university professor and her mother taught at a girls' school. She earned a bachelor's degree at Bennington College in 1940, and completed a master's degree at the University of North Carolina in 1944.

Her younger brother Talcott Williams Seelye was an American diplomat, ambassador to Tunisia and Syria; his daughter Kate Seelye became a journalist. One great-grandfather was Julius Hawley Seelye, president of Amherst College, and his brother Laurenus Clark Seelye was president of Smith College. Other noted members of the extended Seelye family included Benjamin Rush Rhees, president of the University of Rochester, and his son, the philosopher Rush Rhees; and geologist Benjamin Kendall Emerson. Another of Seelye's great-grandfathers, William Frederic Williams, was a Presbyterian missionary in Turkey and Syria.

== Career ==
Seelye was co-founder and director (from 1949 to 1958) of the Theatre Lobby, an experimental theatre company in Washington, D.C. She was an arts associate on the staff of the American Association of University Women (AAUW) from 1950, and toured the United States in the 1960s and 1970s, giving workshops on creativity and performance, under the AAUW's sponsorship. She was co-author of People Space (1969, with architect Melita Rodeck). Seelye was also involved in founding the Capital Area Modern Dance Council, with Pola Nirenska, Erika Thimey, and other Washington-based dancers.

In 1979, she gave an oral history interview for the Bennington Summer School of the Dance Project at the Columbia Center for Oral History Research. That same year, she was named one of seven distinguished alumnae at Bennington College's fiftieth anniversary celebrations.

Seelye was often described as tall, thin, and angular, all characteristics which gave shape to her performances, which she called "poetry-in-dance", and which she sometimes accentuated with flowing costumes. She sometimes included Turkish or Arabic poetry in her performances. Near the end of her career, she created a video archive of her works with filmmaker Vin Grabill.

== Personal life ==
Seelye died in a nursing home in Mitchellville, Maryland in 2013, aged 94 years. Her papers are part of the Williams-Chambers-Seelye-Franck Family Papers at Amherst College.
