= Seelye =

Seelye is a surname. Notable people with the surname include:

- Elizabeth Eggleston Seelye (1858-1923), American writer
- Frederick Thomas Seelye (1879–1962), New Zealand chemist and academic
- Gilbert T. Seelye (1877–1928), New York politician
- Julius Hawley Seelye (1824–1895), American missionary, writer and politician
- Kate Seelye, American journalist
- Laurenus Clark Seelye (1837–1924), American college president
- Talcott Williams Seelye (1922–2006), American diplomat and writer

== See also ==
- Seeley (surname)
- Seelye Brook
