= Housing at Smith College =

Housing at Smith College is provided for students to live in while completing their studies. Smith requires most undergraduate students to live on-campus in order to aid social cohesion.

As women's colleges in the United States were relatively rare in 1875 when it opened, Smith had to decide how to properly house young women students. Unlike most institutions of its type, the College does not have dorms, but rather 36 separate houses built over time in different architectural styles. This was conceived as a more "domestic" model, and as a way of enforcing socially-approved behavior among the young women attending, including the avoidance of lesbian relationships.

A campaign in 1913 involving the NAACP and Carrie Lee, a student who faced discrimination from Smith, became a precedent that allowed African-American women at the college equal rights to campus housing as their white counterparts.

== Early Smith housing, 1875–1880 ==
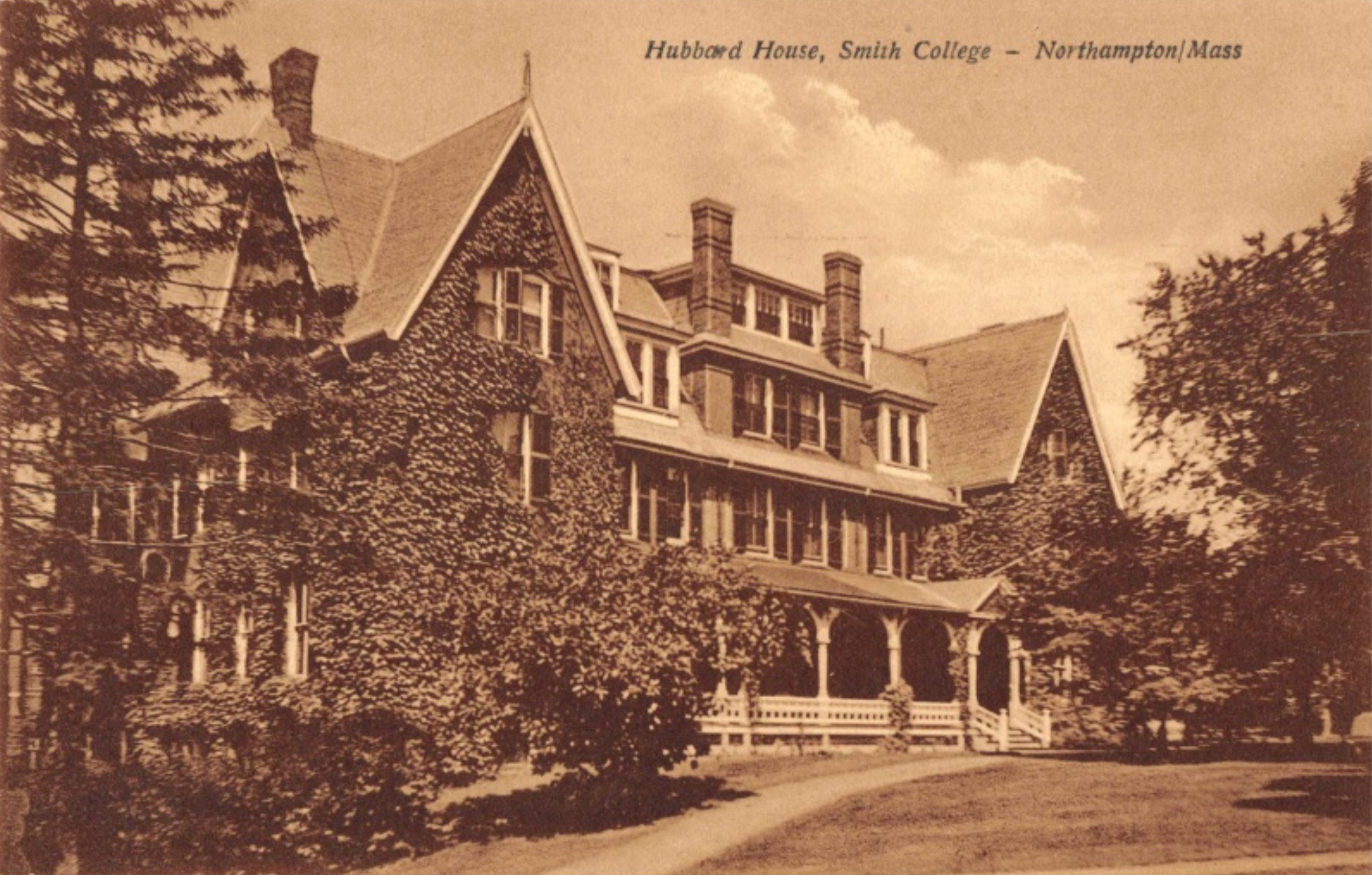
Hubbard House (c.1900)

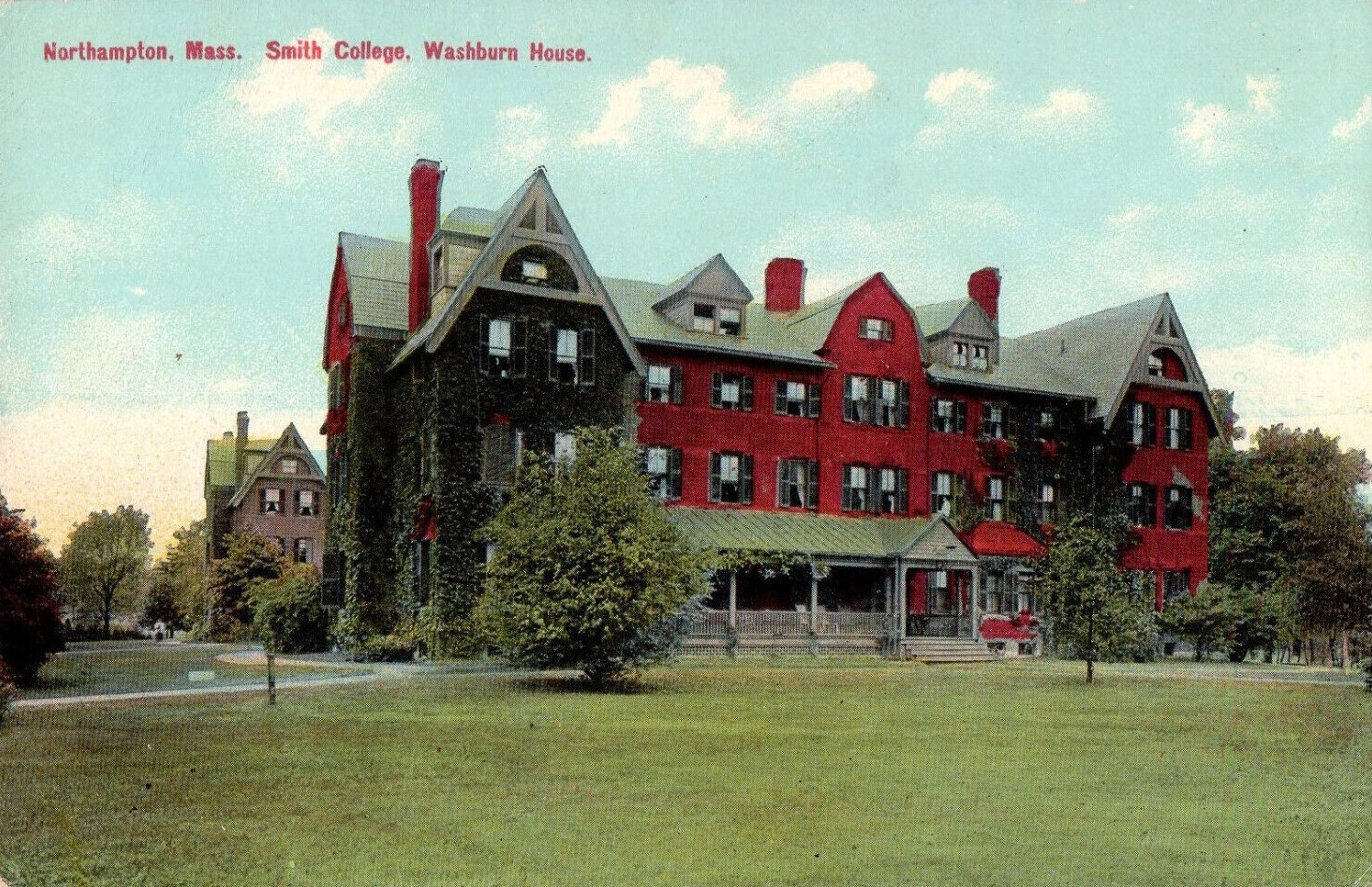
Washburn House (1913)

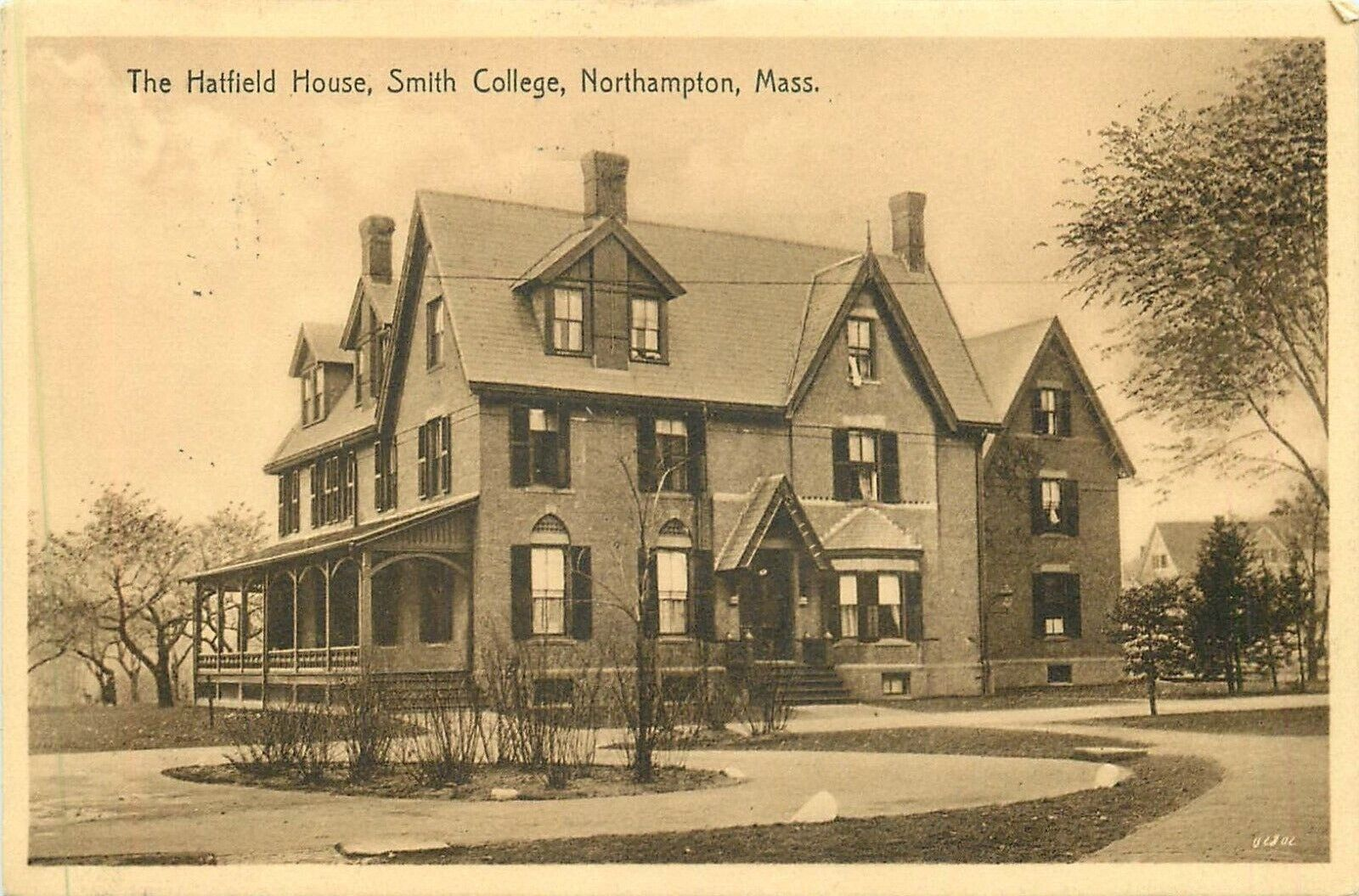
Hatfield House (1914)

When Smith College first opened its doors to students in 1875, there were few precedents for how a women's college should build its dorms. Unlike the two already existing women's colleges, Mount Holyoke and Vassar, the Smith trustees decided to abandon the model of a large building with many individual student rooms. Instead, they took over a house that had belonged to a local family, Dewey House, in order to give their students a domestic space. Dewey House, designed by Thomas Pratt in 1827 for Charles A. Dewey, was a three-story home with Ionic columns and a front porch, parlor, large dining room, and a bedroom for each of the incoming students.

Smith went with the more domestic model of housing in its early years for two reasons. First, the trustees were concerned that by building a large dorm, they would not be able to afford to hire academically rigorous instructors. Second, there was growing concern in the news and amongst the general public that the type of dorms provided by Vassar and Mount Holyoke encouraged female students to form close bonds verging on the romantic and made students unhealthy and unladylike through academic strain.

Laurenus Clark Seelye, Smith's first president, hoped that by keeping students in homes with a cultured matron keeping an eye on them that they could gain an education while keeping within the bounds of Victorian femininity. Sarah W. Humphrey was the first matron of Dewey House, charged with ensuring the students would not overstrain themselves in their studies. In 1877–1879, Smith constructed its first purpose built dorms, all keeping in the style of domestic Victorian architecture, Hatfield, Washburn, and Hubbard Houses, all designed by Peabody & Stearns.

- Dewey
- Hatfield
- Washburn
- Hubbard

== Boarding houses and student culture, 1880–1910 ==
In the 1880s, Smith began to accept more students than it could house on campus. Students began to move off campus into local boarding houses, loosely regulated and approved by the college; residents often chose the next year's occupants, loosely resembling sorority practices. Boarding houses in Northampton varied in condition and price. Around 1898, architect De Witt Smith built the Plymouth for wealthier students, a Richardsonian-Romanesque house which included large suites, a swimming pool, a gymnasium, and a dining hall with a stage. Since the housing was based largely on budget and social networks, Smith housing became highly economically segregated and cliquish. In 1895, Smith College acquired the boarding house formerly privately operated by Mary Smith Tenney, who willed it to the college on the condition that it remain an affordable housing option in which residents cooked and cleaned for themselves.

As students’ house identity became increasingly telling about their economic and social background, bedrooms became the site of elaborate teas, spreads, and chafing dish parties. In the 1890s, as students were increasingly moving off campus and as Seelye’s ideal of a domestic life for his students was becoming further from the reality, Smith hired the Brocklesby firm to build four new houses, Morris, Lawrence, Dickinson, and Tyler. Although these houses still used the gables, large central staircases, and domestic public spaces typical of New England homes, each house roomed sixty women, departing sharply from the domestic ideal.

- Morris
- Lawrence
- Tyler
- Dickinson

== Ada Louis Comstock: 1910–1926 ==
In 1910, Seelye's long presidency came to an end and Marion LeRoy Burton took his place. In 1912, Burton hired Ada Louis Comstock to be the new dean of students and she continued in the position into the presidency of William Allan Nielson. During her time as dean of students, Comstock made it her goal to reform the housing at Smith. Comstock believed that Smith needed to create a democratic environment where students could socialize with each other regardless of economic background, and she saw the housing system as the chief impediment to her goal. In order to ensure that students of all backgrounds mixed, Comstock convinced the college to acquire several large homes on Elm Street and to build large dormitories, designed by John W. Ames, Edwin Dodge, and Karl S. Putnam, creating the ten dorms that made up the Georgian, red-brick Quadrangle. These new dorms departed sharply from earlier Smith houses with large elegant gathering spaces on the first floor and on the upper floors small cubicle-like rooms lining the central hall, and began a new tradition of honoring Smith faculty and alumni through naming. The design was motivated only partially by Smith's concern for creating a democratic social life. The design was also created to combat the longstanding fear that if students spent too much of their social life unsupervised in private bedrooms that their close female friendships might form into dangerous lesbian bonds.

- Elm Street Houses
- Ellen Emerson
- Cushing
- Jordan
- Morrow
- Martha Wilson
- Gardiner
- Wilder (renamed Haynes in 2024 after Euphemia Haynes)
- Comstock
- Laura Scales
- Franklin King

== Carrie Lee and housing integration ==
Although several African-American students had graduated from Smith College by the 1910s, it was not until 1913 that the college formally addressed the issue of housing African-American students on campus. In 1913, Smith College accepted Carrie Lee, an African-American honors student graduating from The New Bedford High School in New Bedford, Massachusetts. Lee applied for on-campus housing and was assigned room three in Tyler Annex, a room she would share with Eleanor Nickey, a white student from Tennessee. Although the college accepted Lee in full knowledge of her race, the Dean's Office was unaware that Lee was African-American when they assigned her room. Knowing that rooms on campus were limited—Lee's father, Charles Cranston Lee, promptly sent a letter acknowledging his daughter's placement and paying the fee necessary to reserve her room.

However, when Lee's white roommate arrived to find that she would be sharing a room with Lee, an African-American student, she contacted the administration, which chose to deny Lee the room she had been promised in favor of appeasing her roommate. Lee attempted to secure board in one of the college-approved off-campus boarding houses, but each landlord refused to house her. Her only off-campus option was to work and be housed as a servant in town. Lee's mother suggested she leave the college rather than endure the insult of being denied fair housing. Lee chose to stay, living temporarily with Smith College Greek Professor Julia Caverno, a woman from a family of strong abolitionist leanings who had housed Otelia Cromwell, Smith's first African-American graduate, nearly a decade earlier. Lee's mother then wrote to Cromwell for help.

Cromwell, whose interest in Smith College affairs continued after her graduation in 1900, and who had met Lee while visiting family in New Bedford, wrote to then Smith College president, Marion LeRoy Burton to protest Lee's treatment. President Burton insisted the decision had been made in accordance with housing precedents. Although this first letter met with little sympathy from the college's administration, Cromwell's second letter to Jessie Fauset, a high school teacher with close connections to the newly founded National Association for the Advancement of Colored People (NAACP), yielded some progress. In October 1913, Fauset wrote to Joel Spingarn, who was deeply involved with the NAACP, explaining Lee's situation. Spingarn eventually made a trip to Northampton to investigate the charges. Meanwhile, Moorfield Storey, founding president of the NAACP, wrote to President Burton promising action should the charges against Smith prove credible.

Thanks to this pressure from NAACP officials, as well as a threat of resignation over the incident from Smith Trustee Ruth Bowles Baldwin, President Burton and the Board of Trustees chose to reconsider their decision to exclude Lee from campus housing. Lee was assigned a room in Albright House, then considered one of the most desirable houses. Lee's case became a precedent that allowed African-American women at Smith the same privilege of campus housing as their white counterparts.
