= Dorothea Seelye Franck =

American writer

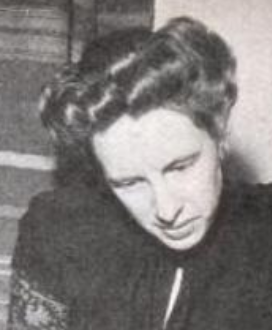
- Dorothea Seelye Franck, from a 1946 publication of the US Department of State
- Born: Dorothea Chambers Seelye; June 8, 1917; Chatham, New Jersey, U.S.
- Died: October 27, 1988; Syracuse, New York, U.S.
- Occupation: Writer
- Relatives: Talcott Williams Seelye (brother); Mary-Averett Seelye (sister); Julius Hawley Seelye (great-grandfather); Kate Seelye (niece)

Dorothea Chambers Seelye Franck (June 8, 1917 – October 27, 1988) was an American writer, editor, and Middle East specialist.

== Early life ==
Dorothea Seelye was born in Chatham, New Jersey, the daughter of college professors Laurens Hickok Seelye and Kate Ethel Chambers Seelye, and the great-granddaughter of politician and college president Julius Hawley Seelye. Her mother completed a doctorate at Columbia University in 1919, two years after Dorothea was born. She was raised in Lebanon, where her parents taught at the American University of Beirut. Her sister Mary-Averett Seelye had a career in dance, and her brother Talcott Williams Seelye was a diplomat.

Seelye attended Bryn Mawr College and graduated from St. Lawrence University. She earned a master's degree from American University.

== Career ==
Seelye worked in Egypt during World War II, translating for the Allies at the Office of Strategic Services. Later she worked in Washington, D.C., at the State Department, and for the American Friends of the Middle East. She edited the Americans for Justice in the Middle East (AJME) News. She founded the Turkish-American Women's Group when she lived in Istanbul from 1956 to 1965. She lived in Beirut again in the 1980s, and on her parents' farm in Plainfield, Massachusetts, and in Syracuse, New York.

== Publications ==
Dorothea Seelye Franck was a writer and editor, usually on topics concerning the Middle East and education, in publications including The Middle East Journal, Foreign Service Journal, and The Christian Science Monitor. She also wrote a book about finger crochet, and two children's books.

- "In the Minds of Men" (1946, pamphlet)
- "Cultural and Scientific Cooperation in the Near East" (1946, a three-part series)
- "The Middle East Economy in 1949" (1950, with Peter G. Franck)
- "The Interchange of Government Experts" (1950)
- "Implementation of Technical Assistance: United Nations Programs in Haiti" (1951, with Marian Neal and Peter G. Franck)
- Islam in the Modern World (1951, edited by Franck)
- "Pakhtunistan - Disputed Disposition of a Tribal Land" (1952)
- "The American School at Tangier" (1953)
- The Cat Who Loved Bach (children's book)
- "Tales" (1958, with Aziz Nesin)
- "Turkish Women in Engineering" (1961)
- Mother Kaz (1963, children's book, with Selma Emiroǧlu Aykan̄)
- "Missionaries Send Bas Reliefs to the United States" (1980)
- Finger Crochet (1984, with Susan Williamson)

== Personal life ==
Seelye married German-born economist and professor Peter Goswyn Franck in 1940. They had two daughters, Karen and Marianne. Dorothea Seelye Franck died from cancer in 1988, aged 71 years. The Williams-Chambers-Seelye-Franck Papers at Amherst College contain some of her papers. Journalist Kate Seelye is her niece.
