= Amasa Norcross =

American politician

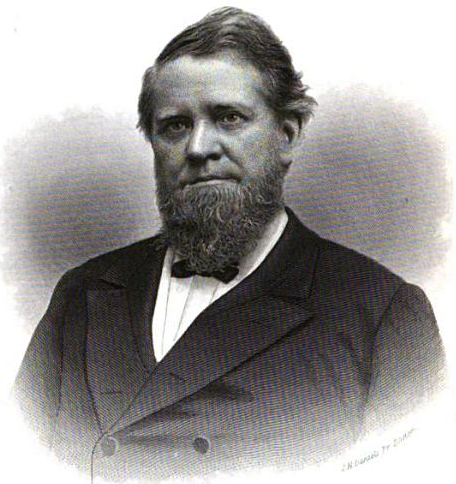

Member of the U.S. House of Representatives from Massachusetts's 10th district
- In office March 4, 1877 – March 3, 1883
- Preceded by: Julius Hawley Seelye
- Succeeded by: William W. Rice

Mayor of Fitchburg, Massachusetts
- In office 1873–1875
- Preceded by: Position created
- Succeeded by: Eugene Miles

Member of the Massachusetts House of Representatives
- In office 1858-1859; 1862

Personal details
- Born: January 26, 1824 Rindge, New Hampshire
- Died: April 2, 1898 (aged 74) Paris, France
- Party: Republican
- Profession: Lawyer
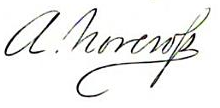
- Signature

Amasa Norcross (January 26, 1824 – April 2, 1898) was an American politician who was a member of the United States House of Representatives from Massachusetts and the first mayor of Fitchburg, Massachusetts.

Born in Rindge, New Hampshire, Norcross attended the common schools and Appleton Academy, New Ipswich, New Hampshire. He studied law, was admitted to the bar in 1847 and commenced practice in Worcester, Massachusetts. He served as member of the Massachusetts House of Representatives in 1858, 1859, and again in 1862. He was assessor of internal revenue from August 1862 until May 1873, when the office was abolished. He served as mayor of the city of Fitchburg, Massachusetts in 1873 and 1874. He served in the Massachusetts Senate in 1874.

Norcross was elected as a Republican to the Forty-fifth, Forty-sixth, and Forty-seventh Congresses (March 4, 1877 – March 3, 1883). He was not a candidate for renomination in 1882. He resumed the practice of law. He died in Paris, France, April 2, 1898, while on a visit to his daughter, painter Eleanor Norcross. He was interred in Laurel Hill Cemetery, Fitchburg, Massachusetts.

== See also ==
- 1874 Massachusetts legislature
- Massachusetts House of Representatives' 6th Worcester district

U.S. House of Representatives
Preceded by Julius H. Seelye	Member of the U.S. House of Representatives from Massachusetts's 10th congressional district March 4, 1877 – March 3, 1883	Succeeded by William W. Rice
