= Caroline Dwight Emerson =

American children's writer (1891–1973)

Caroline Dwight Emerson (1891–1973) was an American writer of children's books and an educator.

Emerson was born on March 14, 1891, in Amherst, Massachusetts to Benjamin Kendall Emerson and Mary Annette (Hopkins) Emerson.

She taught at the Brearley School from 1918 – 1935 and was the elementary director at the Spence School in New York from 1935 to 1949. She earned a Bachelor of Science from Columbia University in 1930.

Emerson published more than a dozen books during her career as a writer.

Emerson died at Harrington Memorial Hospital in Southbridge, Massachusetts on December 19, 1973.

== Selected works ==
- A Merry-Go-Round of Modern Tales. Illustrated by Lois Lenski. Dutton, 1927.
- Mr. Nip and Mr. Tuck. Illustrated by Lois Lenski. Dutton, 1930.
- Father's Big Improvements. Scholastic, 1936.
- Old New York for Young New Yorkers; published later as New York City, Old and New. Illustrated by Alida Conover. Dutton, 1932, 1937, 1953.
- Indian Hunting Grounds. Illustrated by Remington Schuyler. J. B. Lippincott, 1938.
- School Days in Disneyville. Walt Disney Productions, 1939.
- Mickey Sees the U.S.A. D.C. Heath and Company, 1944.
- The Little Green Car. Grosset, 1946. Illustrated by Paul Galdone.
- Mr. Nip and Mr. Tuck in the Air. Illustrated by W.C. Nims. Dutton, 1946.
- Make Way for the Thruway. Golden Press, 1961.
- The Magic Tunnel. Stokes, 1940; Scholastic, 1964.
- All in a Day's Work. Wonder Books, 1964.
- New Amsterdam; Old Holland in the New World. Illustrated by Harvey Kidder. Garrard Publishing Company, 1967.
