= Winfrid Alden Stearns =

American naturalist (1852–1909)

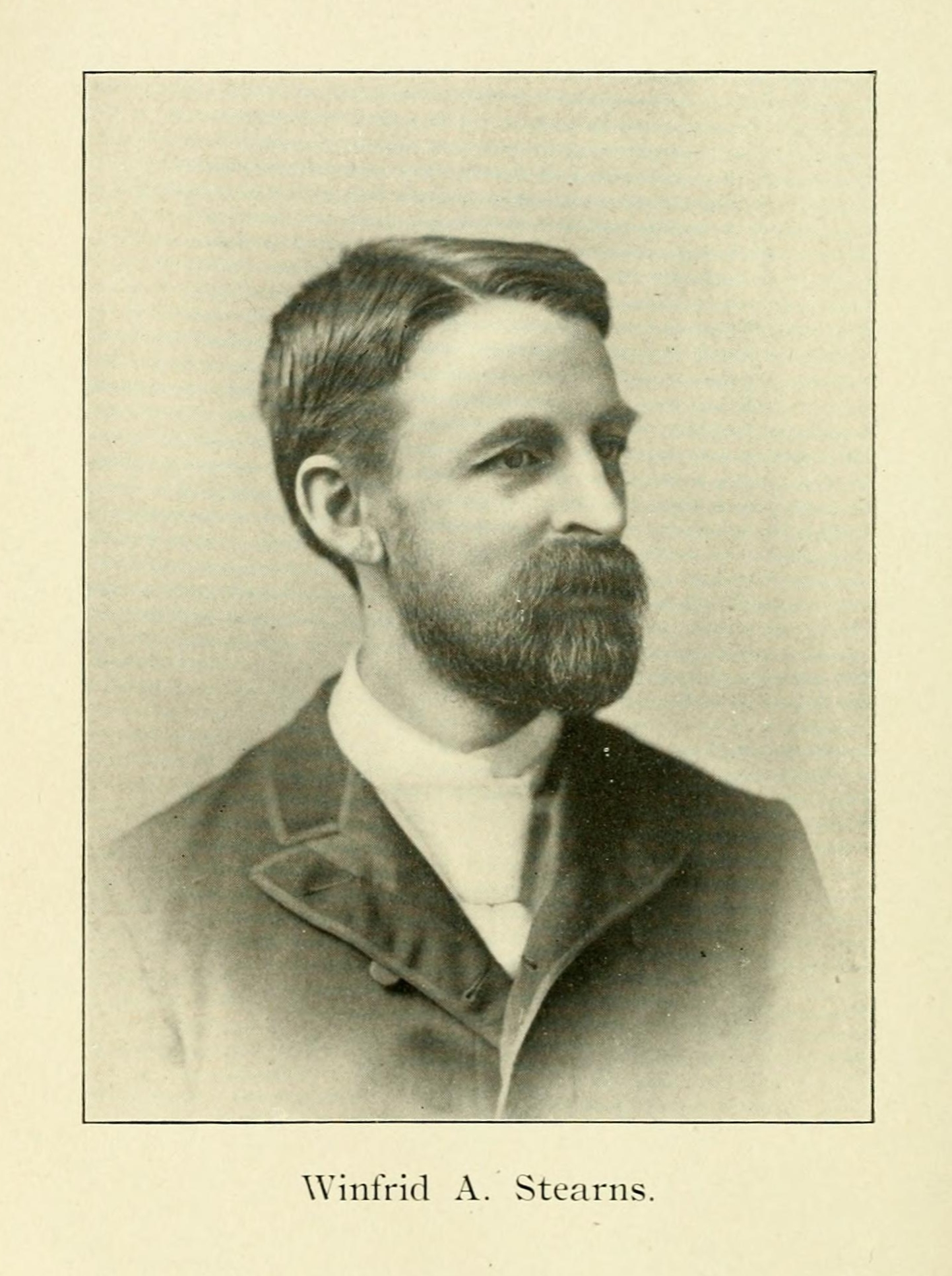

Winfrid Alden Stearns (13 July 1852 – 10 May 1909) was an American naturalist, specimen collector, and writer who took an interest in the birds of Labrador and also wrote on the birds of New England.

Stearns was born in Cambridge, Massachusetts, to Rev. William Augustus Stearns (1805-1876) and his first wife Rebecca Alden Frazer (1803-1855). He studied at Amherst College where his father was president from 1854 to 1876. He graduated in 1876, taking part in university activities as the manager of the Salem Press and working with the Massachusetts State Agricultural College and serving as curator of its agricultural museum. He also worked for F. W. Putnam and Co publishers in 1879. Stearns took an interest in natural history from an early age, collecting birds eggs as a boy. He obtained some income from selling specimens to natural history museums, corresponded with Spencer Fullerton Baird, and later became a member of the Nuttall Ornithological Club. He joined a trip of the Amherst College to Labrador in the summer of 1875, visiting again in 1880, and 1882. From 1883 to 1886 he served as a lecturer in entomology at Amherst College. Stearns married Anna Augusta Ballam in 1885.

Stearns wrote a fictional account for young readers of his travels to Labrador in a book Wrecked on Labrador (1884). He wrote New England Bird Life, a Manual of New England Ornithology (1881-1883) which was edited by Elliott Coues, although it has been suggested that Coues may have written most of it.
