= Julia Harwood Caverno =

American classical philologist

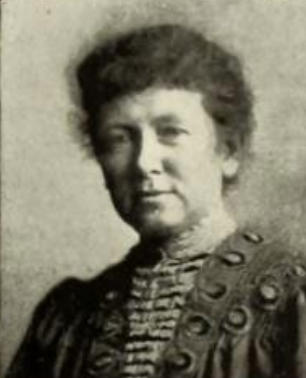
- Julia Harwood Caverno, from the 1907 yearbook of Smith College
- Born: December 19, 1862; Milwaukee, Wisconsin
- Died: February 4, 1949 (aged 86); Northampton, Massachusetts
- Occupation: Professor of Greek
- Employer: Smith College

Julia Harwood Caverno (December 19, 1862 – February 4, 1949) was an American classical philologist, who was the John M. Green Professor of Greek at Smith College.

== Biography ==
Julia Harwood Caverno was born on 19 December 1862 in Milwaukee, Wisconsin, to the Reverend Charles and Abbie H. S. Caverno. While at school she wrote to the Quaker poet John Greenleaf Whittier, whose poem Snow-Bound she and a friend had memorized . She was educated at Smith College for both her BA and MA degrees, graduating in 1887 and 1890 respectively. Her MA thesis examined the similes of Homer in relation to those found in Virgil, Dante, Milton and Tennyson's works.

== Career ==
From 1887 to 1893 Caverno taught Latin and Greek at the Grant Collegiate Institute, Chicago. In 1893 she joined Smith College as a lecturer in Greek. In 1905 she was promoted to full professorship. In 1912 she was promoted to the Head of Greek, a position she held until her retirement as John M. Green Professor in 1931.

In 1905 she was the only woman selected to be on the founding committee of the Classical Association of New England. She was President of CANE for the year 1926-7. In her presidential address, she stated that:

Most of us are humanists also. We not only believe that the proper study of mankind is man, but that the verb "to teach" takes two accusatives, one of the person and the other of the thing. And woe to him who forgets either of those objects!

From 1914-37 she was a member of the Managing Committee of the American School of Classical Studies at Athens. Her academic career was devoted to the teaching and promotion of Greek, as well as editing the Journal of Smith College Classical Studies from 1920-31.

Caverno published on the role of the messenger in Greek tragedy and on Homer, but published more widely on the teaching of Greek in universities. She was concerned with how the study of Greek could be promoted across all stages of education, and particularly how acting and drama could help students understand Greek literature.

Caverno died at her home in Northampton on 4 February 1949. In her obituary in the ASCSA Report of that year, her colleague from Smith, Agnes Carr Vaughan, wrote:

No tribute to Miss Caverno is complete without calling attention to those qualities of mind and heart which made her name a legend on the Smith campus and elsewhere. Her sense of values, her keen judgement, and above all her inimitable humour and wise acceptance of life caused young and old alike to seek her counsel. She belonged to a great generation of teachers, and the world is the poorer for their passing.

== Legacy ==
After Caverno's death her family and her students established the Julia Harwood Caverno Prize for excellence in Greek, which has a prize fund today of $2000. The study room for classicists in Smith College's Neilson Library is known as the Caverno Room. The Julia Harwood Caverno Papers are held at Smith College.
