= Seelye Brook =

Stream in Minnesota, U.S.

Coordinates: 45°21′35″N 93°21′52″W

Seelye Brook is a stream in the U.S. state of Minnesota.

Seelye Brook was named for Moses Seelye, an early settler.

== See also ==
- List of rivers of Minnesota
