= Melita Rodeck =

American architect

Melita Rodeck (1914 – March 3, 2011) was an American architect. She studied architecture at the Polytechnic Institute of Vienna, Austria in 1932 and immigrated to the United States in 1939 following the spread of World War II. Rodeck became a registered architect of the District of Columbia in 1952. She was the founder of her own architectural design firm, Melita Rodeck & Associates, and the Regina Institute of Arts. She was a lecturer for the Department of City Planning, Catholic University of America. Throughout her career, Rodeck served the US Army Corps of Engineers, the US Dept. of Housing and Urban Development, and Federal Emergency Management Agency. She was the President of the DC Branch of American Association of University Women, and a member of emeritus of AIA for the Federal Emergency Management Agency.

== Early life and education ==
Melita Rodeck was born in 1914, in Milan, Italy. As a daughter of an engineer and a painter, Rodeck was encouraged by her parents to pursue architecture and received her degree from the Polytechnic Institute of Vienna in 1936. After Hitler took possession of Austria in 1939, Rodeck immigrated to the United States, and later in 1950 moved to Washington, D.C., where she served a number of government agencies.

== Career ==
Rodeck started her career with the General Services Administration of the U.S. federal government when she arrived in the United States. She established her own architectural design firm, Melita Rodeck & Associates, in 1958. During these times and she overtook residences design and townhouse restoration projects in Maryland, Virginia, and Washington, D.C.

Rodeck served architect for research projects at the U.S. Army Corps of Engineers, and coordinator for architectural research for the U.S. Department of Housing and Urban Development. When she served the program manager of Radiological Emergency Preparedness Programs for the Federal Emergency Management Agency from 1980 to 1985, Rodeck designed guidelines to minimize or eliminate flood damage to buildings.

In 1985, Rodeck had retired from federal government work and started working on the establishment of the Regina Institute of Sacred Art as a devout catholic. The Regina Institute of Sacred Art helped parishes to understand and realize the significance of “psychological need and emotional impact of good design by participating in their efforts to redesign and redecorate religious spaces.”

Rodeck co-authored People Space, an American Association of University Women publication with Mary-Averett Seelye, and architectural consultant Jane Hough in 1969.

== Death and legacy ==
Rodeck died on March 3, 2011, at the age of 96. Her papers are collected and archived at the International Archive of Women in Architecture, Virginia Polytechnic Institute and State University.
