= William Augustus Stearns =

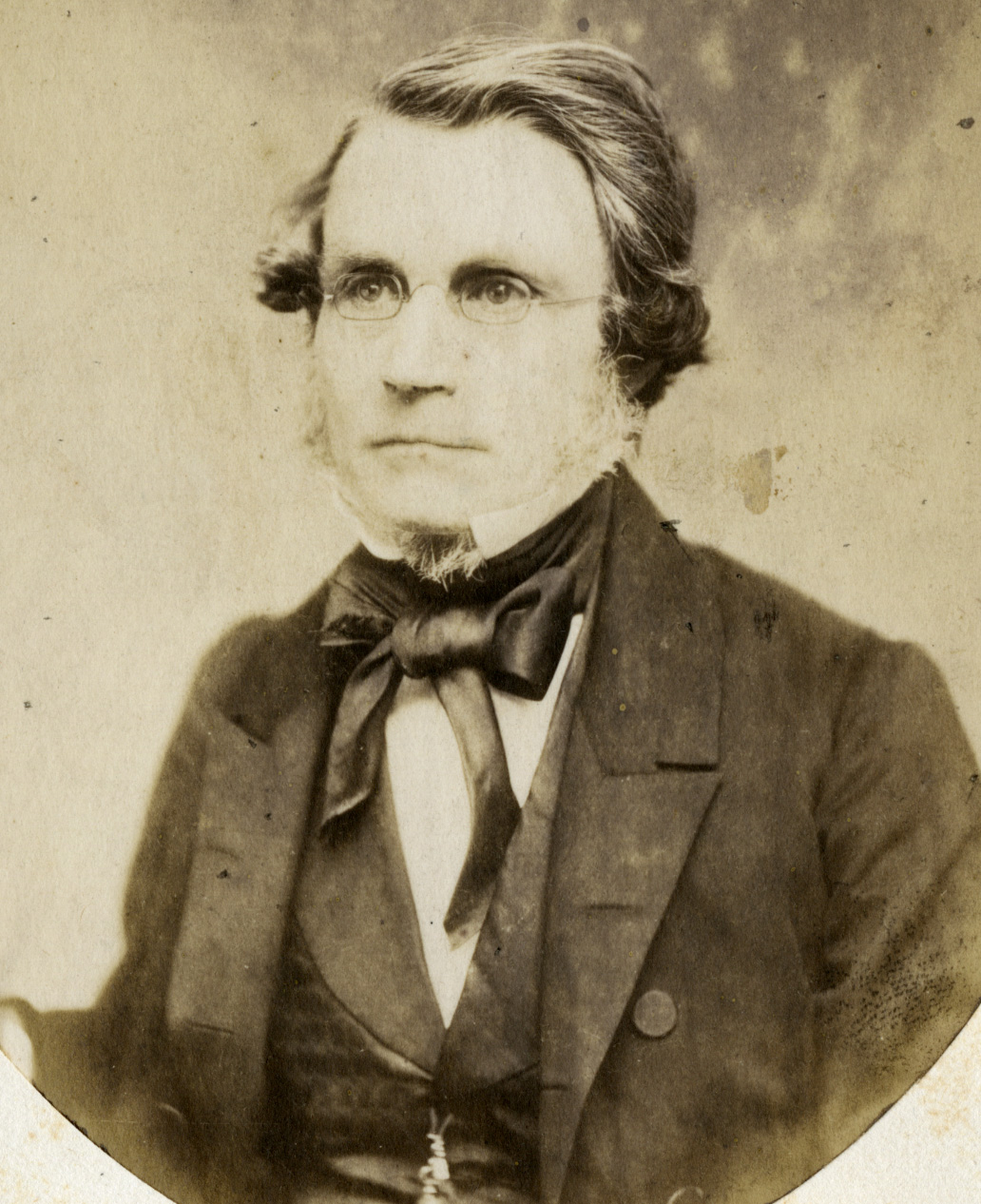
- Born: March 17, 1805; Bedford
- Died: June 8, 1876 (aged 71); Springfield
- Alma mater: Harvard University; Andover Newton Theological School
- Occupation: Cleric; teacher
- Employer: Amherst College

Signature
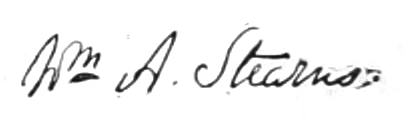

William Augustus Stearns (March 17, 1805 – June 8, 1876) was a 19th-century American Reformed minister and teacher who served as president of Amherst College from 1854 to 1876.

== Biography ==
William A. Stearns was born in Bedford, Massachusetts on March 17, 1805. He graduated from Harvard College in 1827 and then Andover Seminary in 1831. Stearns served as pastor of Prospect Street Congregational Church from 1831 to 1854 when he left to become president of Amherst College. He served as president from 1854 until his death in 1876 and was one of the school's longest serving presidents. His son Wilfrid Alden Stearns was an amateur naturalist who wrote several books.

He died in Springfield, Massachusetts on June 8, 1876.

Academic offices
Preceded by Edward Hitchcock	President of Amherst College; 1854–1876	Succeeded by Julius Hawley Seelye
