= Benjamin Kendall Emerson =

American geologist and author

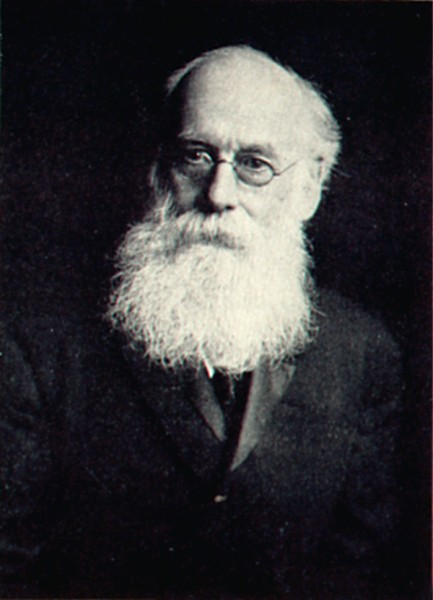
- A portrait of Emerson, circa 1902
- Born: December 20, 1843; Nashua, New Hampshire
- Died: April 7, 1932 (aged 88); Amherst, Massachusetts
- Occupations: Geologist, author

Benjamin Kendall Emerson (December 20, 1843 – April 7, 1932) was an American geologist and author.

== Biography ==
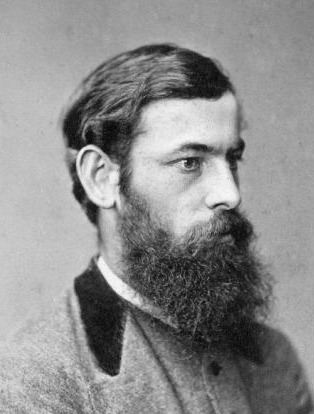
Emerson c. 1867

Emerson attended Amherst College, where he joined the Alpha Delta Phi fraternity and from which he graduated in 1865 as valedictorian. He went on to study in Germany at the University of Berlin, and received his doctorate from the University of Göttingen in 1870. He returned to the United States where he joined the faculty at Amherst, where he was professor of geology and related sciences from 1872 to 1917 and simultaneously at Smith College from 1878 to 1912. He was also assistant geologist from 1890 to 1896, and later geologist from 1896 to 1920 for the United States Geological Survey. He helped found the Geological Society of America and was its president in 1899.

In 1893 he was seriously injured in a train wreck in Ohio, but he recovered. In 1897 he was elected vice president of the International Geological Congress, and attended the meeting of the Congress in St Petersburg, Russia. He followed this with an excursion through Siberia. In 1899 he accompanied the Harriman Alaska Expedition, where Mount Emerson bears his name.

His chief field of study was the geology of western Massachusetts, the Connecticut River valley, and Rhode Island.

== Family ==
Benjamin Kendall Emerson was the son of Benjamin Frothingham Emerson and Eliza Kendall Emerson of Nashua, New Hampshire. He married twice; his first wife was Mary Annette Hopkins, daughter of Rev Erastus Hopkins of Northampton, Massachusetts. They were married on April 2, 1873, and had six children: Charlotte Freylinghuysen (b. 1874), Benjamin Kendall (b. 1875), Edward Hopkins (b. 1877), Annette Hopkins (b. 1879), Malleville Wheelock (b. 1887), and Caroline Dwight (1891-1973), who became a prolific author of over 20 children's books, including The Hat-Tub Tale, about the Bay of Fundy.

Mary Annette Hopkins Emerson died on July 3, 1897; Benjamin Emerson then married Anna James Seelye, daughter of Julius Seelye of Amherst on April 4, 1901. They had two children: Elizabeth James (b. 1903) and Henry Seelye (b. 1907).

== Professional memberships ==
Emerson was a member of the following organizations:

- The American Academy of Arts and Sciences (1895)
- The American Association for the Advancement of Science (vice president, 1896)
- The American Philosophical Society (1897)
- The American Geographical Society
- Deutsche Geologische Gesellschaft
- Society of Naturalists of Eastern United States
- Washington Academy of Sciences
- American Philosophical Society
- Geological Society of America (original fellow, 1889; second vice president, 1897; first vice president, 1898; president, 1899)
- Phi Beta Kappa

== Works ==
Among his works are Geology of Old Hampshire County, Massachusetts (1898), Geology of Massachusetts and Rhode Island (1917), and a report (1904) on the Harriman Expedition to Alaska. The Archives and Special Collections at Amherst College holds a collection of his papers.
