= Talcott Williams Seelye =

American diplomat

Talcott Williams Seelye (March 6, 1922 – June 8, 2006) was a United States Foreign Service Officer, United States Ambassador, author, and commentator. Seelye entered the Foreign Service in 1950 and went on to serve as United States Ambassador to Tunisia and Syria.

== Early life ==
Seelye was born in Beirut, Lebanon, the son of American parents, Kate Ethel (Chambers) and Laurens Hickok Seelye, a professor at the American University of Beirut. He attended Deerfield Academy and then graduated from Amherst College in 1944 and enlisted in the U.S. Army for a three-year term during World War II. His time training at Camp Ritchie in the Military Intelligence Training Center classifies him among 20,000 other Ritchie Boys.

== Diplomatic career ==
Seelye joined the Foreign Service in 1949, and was posted in Stuttgart, Ulm, Amman, Beirut, and Kuwait. From 1960 to 1964, he was Iraq-Jordan desk officer, then officer in charge of Arabian Peninsula affairs, at the State Department.

In 1964 to 65 Seelye attended the National War College, and from 1965 to 1968, he was Chief of Mission in Jidda. From 1968 to 1972, he was Country Director for Lebanon, Jordan, the Syrian Arab Republic, and Iraq.

From 1972 to 1976, Seelye was Ambassador to Tunisia. He was Deputy Assistant Secretary of State for African Affairs from 1976 to 1977. In 1976 he also served as special representative to the President of Lebanon. From 1979 to 1981, Seelye was Ambassador to Syria, which was his final post before retiring.

== Post–Foreign Service career ==
In editorial articles, television commentary, and other public appearances, Seelye had been critical of Israel for its militarism and of US foreign policy for being in support of such policies. Within the framework of America's pro-Israel lobby (see American Israel Public Affairs Committee, Seelye has often been portrayed as an anti-Zionist Arabist. His work has been reviewed, critically, by pro-Israel groups such as Committee for Accuracy in Middle East Reporting in America (CAMERA), Middle East Forum (with its Campus Watch project), and the Washington Institute for Near East Policy, who have reported on Seelye's ties to oil companies and the Saudi Arabian House of Saud. Critics include Steven Emerson (The American House of Saud: The Secret Petrodollar Connection), Daniel Pipes, Martin Kramer, David Horowitz, and Robert D. Kaplan.

After the September 11 attacks in 2001, Seelye again found himself in the spotlight as an expert on Middle Eastern affairs and continued to advise think tanks and policy making groups. He also continues to be strongly criticized by writers who do not agree with his views on the Middle East, such as an Atlantic Monthly article Robert D. Kaplan in which he wrote of Seelye that such "Arabists and other area specialists may be emotionally involved, through marriage or friendship, with host countries – often causing them to dislike the policies that Washington orders them to execute." Seelye and over 50 former US ambassadors and government officials signed the Middle East Policy Council's letter to President George W. Bush, criticizing US policy on the Israeli–Palestinian conflict, specifically Israeli Prime Minister Ariel Sharon's unilateral Gaza withdrawal plan, announced in 2004 and enacted in 2005 (letter cited below), which followed earlier British diplomats' letter to Prime Minister Tony Blair.

== Noted Family Members ==
Seelye was a descendant of Captain Robert Seelye who arrived from England with John Winthrop in 1630.

He was a great-grandson of Julius Hawley Seelye (famed preacher, writer and fifth president of Amherst College).

Seelye's older sisters were writer Dorothea Seelye Franck, and dancer and performance artist Mary-Averett Seelye.

Seelye's youngest daughter Kate Seelye. is a former journalist specializing in the Middle East. She has been working for a decade in different roles at the Middle East Institute in Washington D.C..

== Service chronology ==
Talcott W. Seelye's Diplomatic Chronology
Position	Host country or organization	Year
US Army Officer	Iran	1944 to 1946
US Foreign Service	Germany	1950 to 1951
US Foreign Service	Jordan	1952 to 1955
US Foreign Service	Kuwait	1956 to 1960
US Foreign Service	Saudi Arabia	1966 to 1968
US State Department	Country Director for Iraq, Lebanon, Jordan, and Syria	1968 to 1972
U.S. Ambassador	Tunisia	1972 to 1976 (under Richard Nixon and Gerald Ford)
US Presidential Envoy	Lebanon	1976 (under Gerald Ford)
U.S. Ambassador	Syria	1979 to 1981 (under Jimmy Carter)

== Written works ==
=== Books ===
- U.S.-Arab Relations: The Syrian Dimension (Portland: Portland State University Press, 1985) ISBN 0-916729-02-8

=== Articles ===
- Journal of Palestine Studies – review of Syria and Israel: by Moshe Ma'oz (1996)
- AMEU The Link – book review (1995)
- Journal of Palestine Studies – review of Deliberate Deceptions by Paul Findley (1995)
- Numerous articles

=== U.S. Department of State documents ===
- Memorandum – on TWA hijacking (1969)
- Memorandum on military supply program in Jordan (1968)
- Memorandum on Arab-Israeli impasse (1968)
- Memorandum on message to King Hussein of Jordan (1968)
- Memorandum on audience with King Hussein (1968)
- Memorandum on message for King Hussein (1968)
- Telegram on 1967 ceasefire (1968)
- Telegram on Lebanon's views on 1967 ceasefire (1968)
- Telegram on discussions of Jordan's internal defense (1968)
- Memorandum on message to Jordanian prime minister Talhouni (1968)
- Memorandum on Yemen Situation (1962)
- Memorandum on conversation with Crown Prince Faisal of Saudi Arabia (1962)
- Memorandum on Yemen situation (1962)
- Paper on US position on the recognition of the Yemen Arab Republic (1962)
- Telegram on Assistant Secretary Philip Talbot's meeting with Saudi Crown Prince Faisal in New York (1962)
- Paper on death of Yemeni imam Ahmed bin Yahya (1962)
- Memorandum of conversation between Assistant Secretary Philip Talbot and Saudi Crown Prince Faisal in New York (1962)
- Memorandum on matters from White House meeting between President John F. Kennedy and King Saud of Saudi Arabia (1962)
- Memorandum of conversation between President Kennedy and King Saud (1962)
- Circular Airgram from USDOS to US embassies in Kuwait and United Kingdom (1962)
- Memorandum on upcoming meeting between President Kennedy and King Saud (1961)

Diplomatic posts
Preceded by John A. Calhoun	U.S. Ambassador to Tunisia; 1972–1976	Succeeded by Edward W. Mulcahy
Preceded by Richard W. Murphy	U.S. Ambassador to Syria; 1978–1981	Succeeded by Robert P. Paganelli
