= Agnes Carr Vaughan =

American classical scholar

Academic background
- Education: University of Michigan

Agnes Carr Vaughan was Professor of Classical Languages and Literature at Smith College and an author of historical fiction set in the ancient world.

== Academic career ==
Vaughan studied at Galloway College and taught in high schools and colleges in Arkansas, Michigan and Missouri. Vaughan was awarded a PhD from the University of Michigan in 1917 for a thesis Madness in Greek thought and custom. She directed student productions of classical plays at Hardin College and Wells College. In 1926, she joined Smith College as associate professor in Greek and in 1945 was promoted to Professor of Classical Languages and Literature. She retired in 1952. She was awarded a Sophia Smith Fellowship for 1966–67. She was a member of the managing committee of the American School of Classical Studies at Athens from 1944 until her death in the 1970s.

== Publications ==
=== Academic work and non-fiction ===
- (1919) Madness in Greek thought and custom. Maryland: J. H. Furst company
- (1945) The genesis of human offspring. Massachusetts: Smith College Classical Studies
- (1959) The House of the Double Axe; the palace at Knossos. New York: Doubleday
- (1964) Those Mysterious Etruscans. New York: Doubleday

=== Historical Fiction ===
- (1930) Lucian goes a-voyaging, illustrated by Harrie Wood. New York: A.A. Knopf
- (1932) Evenings in a Greek Bazaar. New York: A.A. Knopf
- (1935) Within the Walls. New York: Macmillan
- (1940) Akka, dwarf of Syracuse, illustrated by Elizabeth Tyler Wolcott. New York: Longmans, Green and co.
- (1962) Bury me in Ravenna. New York: Doubleday
- (1967) Zenobia of Palmyra. New York: Doubleday
