= Laurenus Clark Seelye =

President of Smith College (1837–1924)

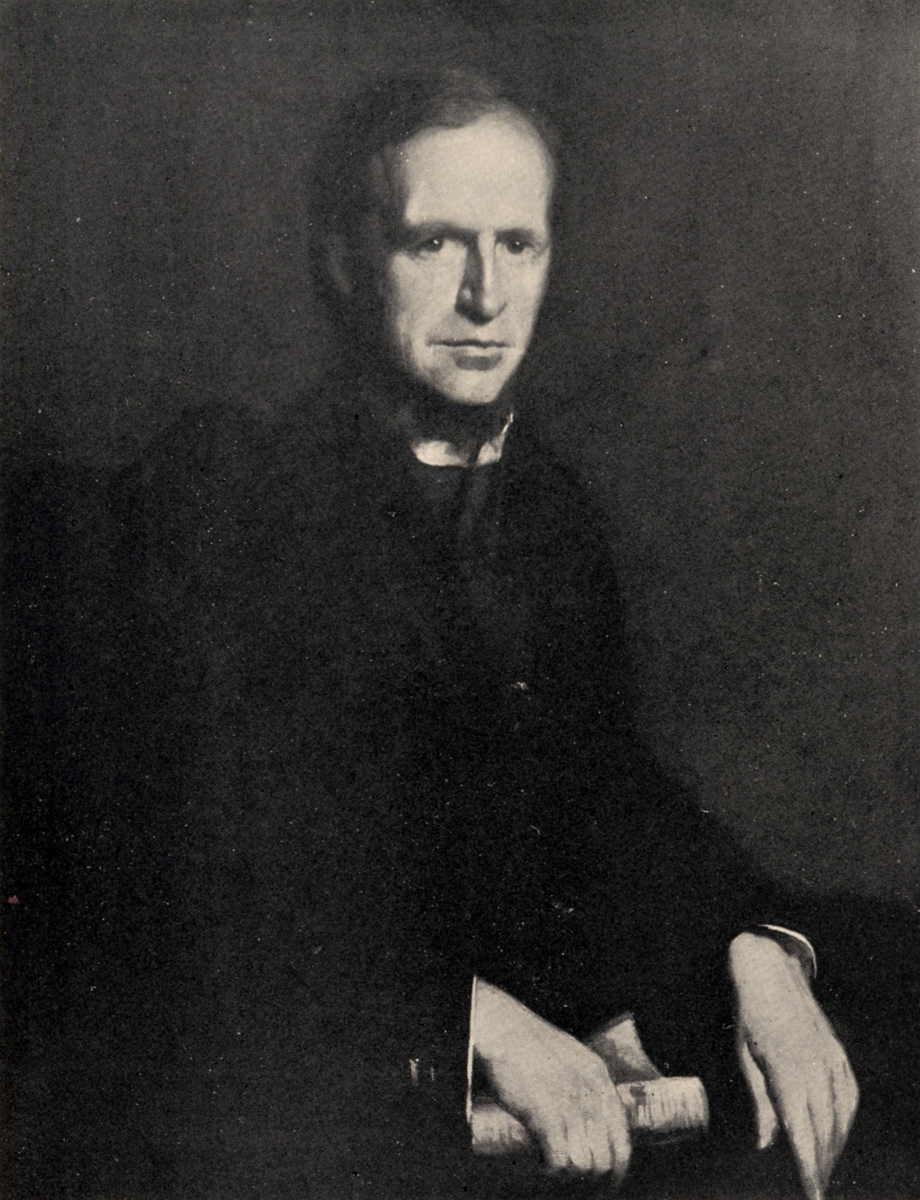

1st President of Smith College
- In office 1875–1910
- Preceded by: None
- Succeeded by: Marion LeRoy Burton

Personal details
- Born: September 30, 1837 Bethel, Connecticut
- Died: October 12, 1924 (aged 87) Northampton, Mass
- Education: Union College

Laurenus Clark Seelye (September 30, 1837 – October 12, 1924), known as L. Clark Seelye, was the first president of Smith College, serving from 1873 to 1910. He graduated from Union College (NY) in 1857 with Phi Beta Kappa honors and membership in Kappa Alpha Society. Seelye later studied at Andover Theological Seminary and the Universities of Berlin and Heidelberg. After serving as a Congregational Minister in Springfield, Massachusetts, he became Williston Professor of Rhetoric, Oratory and English Literature at Amherst College, where his brother Julius was Professor of Mental and Moral Philosophy. Under President Stearns, Amherst College in 1865 had 17 faculty and 203 students. Seelye taught at Amherst from 1865 until his election as President of the newly formed Smith College in nearby Northampton, Massachusetts in 1873.

== Family ==
Seelye was born on September 20, 1837, in Bethel, Connecticut, to Seth Seelye (b Feb 28, 1795; d March 26, 1869) and Abigail (Taylor) Seelye. He is the brother of Julius Hawley Seelye, the fifth president of Amherst College.

Seelye married Henrietta Chapin, daughter of Lyman and Harriet (Sheldon) Chapin, of Albany, on November 17, 1863. They had seven children: Ralph Holland, Harriet Chapin (who would marry Benjamin Rush Rhees) Abigail Taylor, Arthur, Walter Clark, Henrietta, and Bertram.

== Career ==
On July 10, 1873, Seelye accepted the office of President of Smith College from the Smith College board of Trustees. The college admitted its first students in 1875, and officially opened on September 9 of that year. There were 14 students (11 of whom graduated) and 4 faculty, including Seelye.

Smith College had been chartered in 1871, with the main endowment coming from the estate of Sophia Smith, whose will had stipulated that the money be used to found a college for women. It aspired to be the first educational institution which would give young women the same academic and intellectual training that men received at other colleges. The idea of the intellectual and academic equality of women and men was popular in some progressive circles, but was by no means widespread at the time. Thus Seelye, in addition to being President, teacher, fund-raiser, and chief financial officer for the new college, also needed to spend time repeatedly defending the principles upon which the college had been founded. A measure of his success, and of the changing times, may be seen in the fact that, when he retired, the Smith College enrollment had grown from 14 to 1635, and the number of faculty had increased from 4 to 105.

== Retirement ==
Seelye officially retired from his presidency of Smith College on June 14, 1910, at age 73, after 37 years of service. He continued to reside in Northampton, Mass, moving out of the President's House and into a house on Round Hill. He remained active in the civic affairs of Northampton; he was on the board of directors of the People's Institute and was a trustee of the Clarke School for the Deaf, which is now The Clarke Schools for Hearing and Speech. He was a member of the first board of superintendents of the Smith Agricultural School, and when the Red Cross formed a chapter in Northampton he was its first president. He had been a director of the Holyoke Water Power Company, and in 1910 he became vice president.

He was active in the local Congregational Church, serving on church committees and preaching an occasional Sunday sermon. As President Emeritus, he was active in the social and ceremonial life of Smith College, and was a fixture at the annual Commencement exercises.

Seelye died on October 12, 1924.

== Written work ==
- Seelye, Laurenus Clark (1874). The Need of a Collegiate Education for Women. OCLC 800458089.
- Seelye, Laurenus Clark (1888). The Higher Education of Women: its perils and its benefits. OCLC 32499102.
- Seelye, Laurenus Clark (1923). The Early History of Smith College, 1871–1910. OCLC 1924097.

Academic offices
| Preceded by None | President of Smith College; 1873–1910 | Succeeded by Marion LeRoy Burton |
