= Julius Hawley Seelye =

American educator and politician

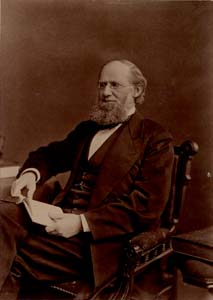

Member of the U.S. House of Representatives from Massachusetts's 10th district
- In office March 4, 1875 – March 3, 1877
- Preceded by: Charles A. Stevens
- Succeeded by: Amasa Norcross

5th President of Amherst College
- In office 1877–1890
- Preceded by: William Augustus Stearns
- Succeeded by: Merrill Edward Gates

Personal details
- Born: September 14, 1824 Bethel, Connecticut
- Died: May 12, 1895 (aged 70) Amherst, Massachusetts
- Resting place: Wildwood Cemetery
- Party: Independent
- Spouse: Elizabeth Tillman James
- Education: Amherst College; Auburn Theological Seminary

Julius Hawley Seelye (September 14, 1824 – May 12, 1895) was an American educator, Congregational clergyman, and politician. He taught mental and moral philosophy at Amherst College from 1858, represented Massachusetts in the United States House of Representatives from 1875 to 1877, and served as the fifth president of Amherst College from 1877 to 1890.

As president he established a system of student self-government known as the Amherst System, and oversaw the college's 1881 adoption of the Latin honors grades cum laude, magna cum laude, and summa cum laude, an arrangement later taken up by many other universities.

== Biography ==
Seelye was born September 14, 1824, in Bethel, Connecticut, to Seth and Abigail (Taylor) Seelye.

He prepared himself for college, then attended Amherst College from 1846 to 1849, when he graduated. While he was at Amherst, he joined the Psi Upsilon fraternity. After graduating, he continued his studies at Auburn Theological Seminary from 1849 to 1852, and at Halle, Prussia, from 1852 to 1853.

Seelye was ordained in Schenectady, New York, on August 10, 1853. From 1853 to 1858, he was the pastor of the First Dutch Reformed Church in Schenectady.

In 1858 he returned to Amherst College as professor of mental and moral philosophy. He was appointed the fifth president of the college in 1877 and held both posts until his retirement in 1890. As president he established a system of student self-government through a "College Senate" that became known as the Amherst System. In 1881 Amherst adopted the Latin honors grades cum laude, magna cum laude, and summa cum laude, an arrangement later taken up by many other universities.

One of his students was Joseph Hardy Neesima, who graduated from Amherst in 1870 and later founded Doshisha University in Kyoto.

In 1872–1873, Seelye made a tour around the world. While on this journey he stopped in Bombay, India, and delivered a course of lectures entitled The Way, The Truth, and the Life, to educated Hindus. He was invited to stay and work with the Christian Mission society in India, but decided to return to Amherst.

He was pastor of the Amherst College Church from 1877 to 1892. Seelye was also a trustee of Mount Holyoke College from 1872 to 1895.

Seelye was elected as an independent to the Forty-fourth Congress, serving from 1875 to 1877. Much of his work in Congress concerned federal policy toward Native Americans. He declined to seek reelection.

He retired from the presidency in 1890, due to failing health, and died on May 12, 1895, at his home in Amherst, Massachusetts. He is buried in Wildwood Cemetery in Amherst.

== Other activities ==
- Seelye lectured at Andover Theological Seminary from 1873 to 1874. He was then a member of the Board of Visitors there from 1874 to 1892.
- Seelye served on the commission to revise the tax laws of Massachusetts from 1874 to 1875.
- Seelye incorporated the Clarke Institute for Deaf Mutes in Northampton, Massachusetts, from 1867 to 1887.
- Seelye was a corporate member of the American Board of Commissioners for Foreign Missions from 1876 to 1895.
- Seelye was president of the Congregational Home Missionary Society from 1885 to 1892.
- Seelye received a Doctor of Divinity degree from Union in 1862.
- Seelye received a Doctor of Laws degree from Columbia in 1876.

== Family ==
On October 26, 1854, Seelye married Elizabeth Tillman James of Albany, New York, who was born in 1833 and died in 1881. They had four children: William James Seelye, born in 1857, graduated from Amherst College in 1879, married Mary A. Clarke of Iowa City in 1886, and died in 1931; Elizabeth James Seelye, who was born in 1862, married James Wilson Bixler, an Amherst graduate, in 1891, and who died in 1894; Anna Hawley Seelye, who was born in 1866, married Benjamin Kendall Emerson, an Amherst College professor, in 1901; and Mabel Seelye, who was born in 1870, married James Bixler in 1898; and died in 1919.

Seelye is the brother of Laurenus Clark Seelye, first president of Smith College. He is the grandfather of J. Seelye Bixler, 16th president of Colby College, and of Elizabeth Seelye Bixler, third dean of the Yale School of Nursing. He is the great-grandfather of Former United States Ambassador Talcott Seelye and is the great-great-grandfather of National Public Radio reporter Kate Seelye.

== Works ==
- Seelye, Julius Hawley (1873). The Way, the Truth, and the Life. Lectures to Educated Hindoos. OCLC 6203533.
- Seelye, Julius Hawley (1875). Christian Missions. OCLC 18331568.
- Seelye, Julius Hawley (1877). History of Philosophy in Epitome (translation of Albert Schwegler's Geschichte der Philosophie im Umriß).
- Seelye, Julius Hawley (1877). The Relations of Learning and Religion. OCLC 1089883.
- Seelye, Julius Hawley (1880). The Sabbath Question. OCLC 56524465.
- Seelye, Julius Hawley (1890). Our Father's Kingdom. OCLC 32774539.
- Seelye, Julius Hawley (1891). Duty. A Book for Schools. OCLC 2779454.
- Seelye, Julius Hawley (1894). Citizenship. A Book for Classes in Government and Law. OCLC 5294712.

== Notes ==
U.S. House of Representatives
Preceded by Charles A. Stevens	Member of the U.S. House of Representatives from Massachusetts's 10th congressional district 1875–1877	Succeeded by Amasa Norcross
Academic offices
Preceded by William Augustus Stearns	President of Amherst College; 1877–1890	Succeeded by Merrill Edward Gates
