= Kate Seelye =

American journalist, Middle East specialist

Kate Seelye is vice president for Arts and Culture at the Middle East Institute where she has worked for a decade in different roles, including as senior vice president. Prior to that, she was a journalist specializing in coverage of the Middle East. Seelye reported for NPR, and has contributed to the BBC, Channel 4, and Frontline/World. She has also worked as a producer for the PBS Newshour based in Los Angeles and as an associate producer at Marketplace.

Seelye graduated from Amherst College in 1984. In addition to her work at the Middle East Institute and before becoming a journalist, she has been employed by Queen Noor of Jordan and as Manager of Media Relations for the American-Arab Anti-Discrimination Committee. In 2004, Seelye received an honorary doctorate () from Amherst College and is also a Fulbright Scholar.

== Family ==
Seelye is one of four children of Talcott W. Seelye (1922–2006), a former U.S. ambassador to Tunisia and Syria, and Joan Hazeltine. Seelye is a descendant of former Amherst College president Julius H. Seelye.

== External links to reportage ==
- PBS Frontline "Syria: Beyond the Axis of Evil?" (October 24, 2008)
- PBS Frontline Palestinian Territories: "Inside Hamas" (May 9, 2006)
- PBS Frontline Syria: "U.N. Murder Investigation Closes in on Syria" (September 21, 2005)
- PBS Frontline Lebanon: "The Earthquake" (May 17, 2005)
- NPR (articles sorted by date)
- NPR (articles sorted by relevance)
- The World (articles sorted by date)
- The World (articles sorted by relevance)
