= Buttermilk Creek (Susquehanna River tributary) =

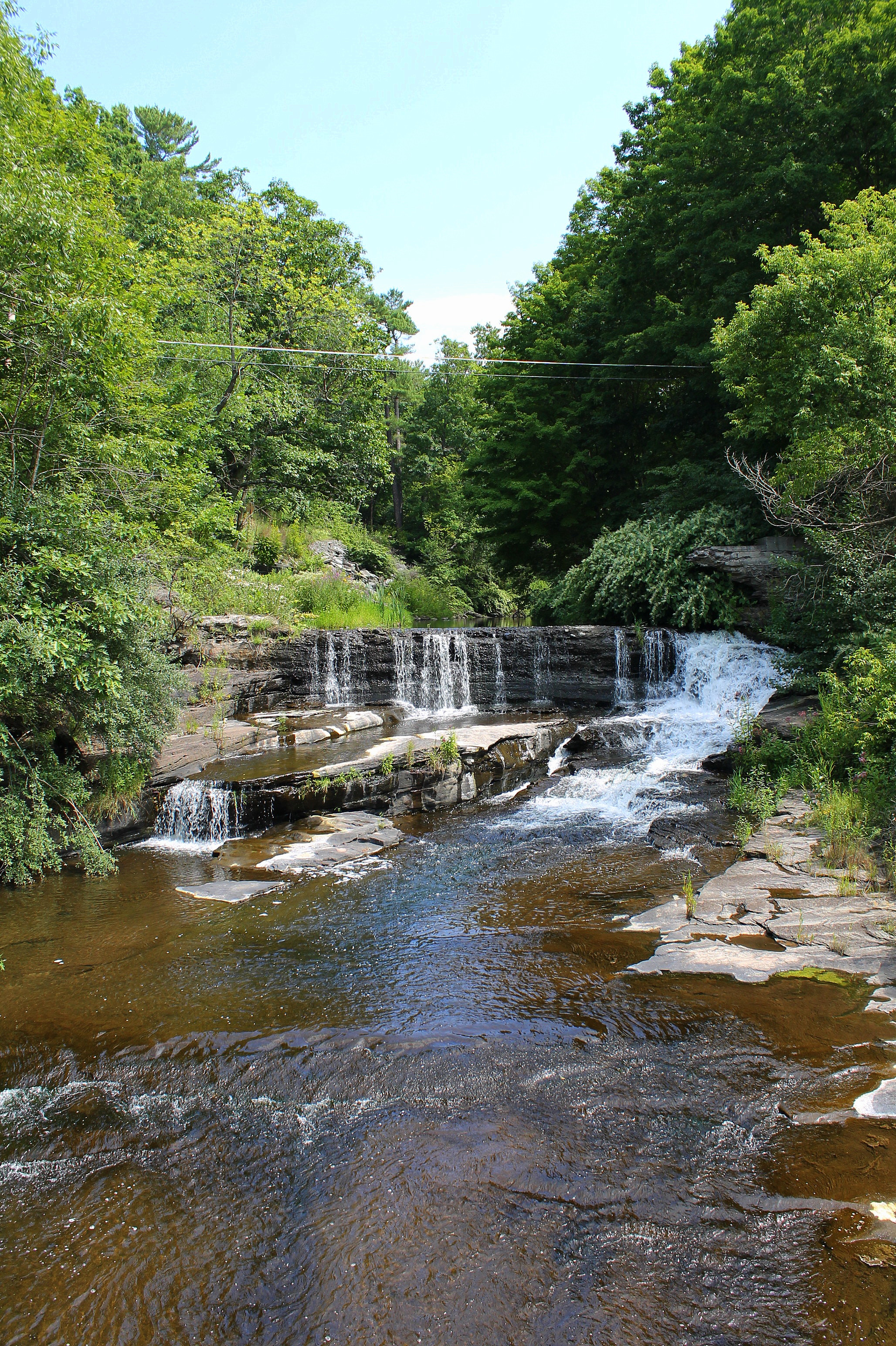
- Buttermilk Creek looking upstream at Buttermilk Falls

Physical characteristics
- Source
  - location: Fords Lake in Newton Township, Lackawanna County, Pennsylvania
  - elevation: between 1,140 and 1,160 feet (347 and 354 m)
- Mouth
  - location: Susquehanna River in Falls Township, Wyoming County, Pennsylvania
  - coordinates: 41°27′37″N 75°51′02″W
  - elevation: 564 ft (172 m)
- Length: 6.8 mi (10.9 km)
- Basin size: 26.1 mi^{2} (68 km^{2})

Basin features
- Progression: Susquehanna River → Chesapeake Bay
- Tributaries
  - left: Beaver Creek
  - right: Falls Creek

Buttermilk Creek is a tributary of the Susquehanna River in Lackawanna County and Wyoming County, in Pennsylvania, in the United States. It is approximately 6.8 miles (10.9 km) long and flows through Newton Township in Lackawanna County and Falls Township in Wyoming County. The watershed of the creek has an area of 26.1 square miles (68 km^{2}). The creek is a perennial stream and is not designated as an impaired waterbody. Major geographical features in its watershed include the Buttermilk Falls in its lower reaches, as well as Fords Lake and Lake Winola.

A number of bridges have been constructed over Buttermilk Creek. There is also some development in the watershed. In the early 1900s, the major industries in the watershed were agriculture and a summer resort. The creek's drainage basin is designated as a Coldwater Fishery and a Migratory Fishery. Hemlock trees inhabit its vicinity. Buttermilk Creek has two named tributaries: Falls Creek and Beaver Creek.

== Course ==
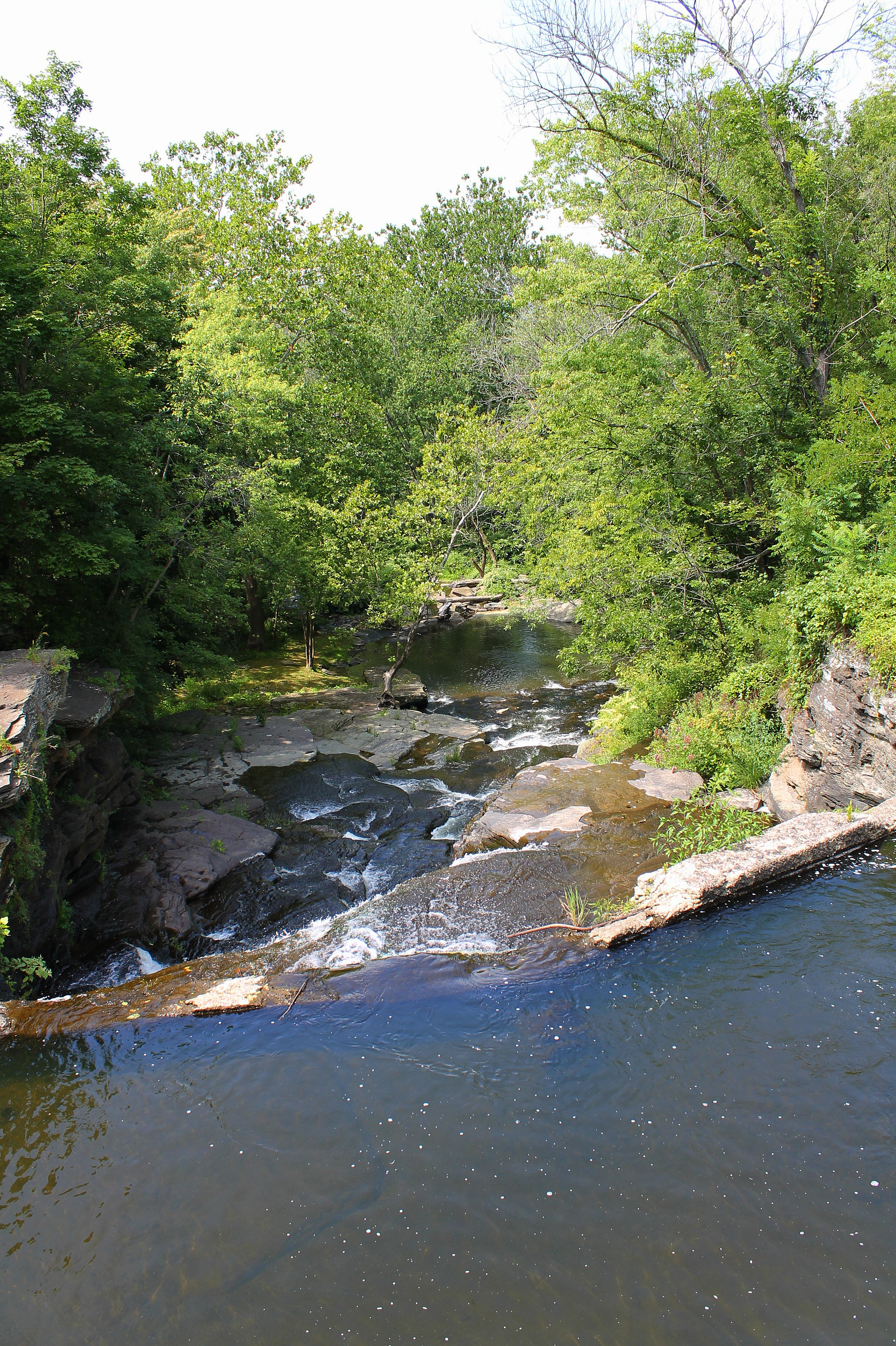
Buttermilk Creek looking downstream at Buttermilk Falls

Buttermilk Creek begins in Fords Lake in Newton Township, Lackawanna County. It flows south for a few tenths of a mile before turning west for a few miles. In this reach, the creek enters a valley, passes through two ponds or small lakes, and passes by Griffin Hill. It then enters Falls Township, Wyoming County, where it eventually turns northwest for a few tenths of a mile, crossing Pennsylvania Route 307. The creek then gradually turns west and then southwest for more than a mile, remaining in its valley and flowing alongside Pennsylvania Route 307. It then receives Beaver Creek, its first named tributary, from the right, and turns south. After a few tenths of a mile, it turns west and receives the tributary Falls Creek from the left. The creek then turns south-southwest for more than a mile and its valley broadens. It then turns south-southeast for a few tenths of a mile before turning south-southwest for a few tenths of a mile. At this point, the creek turns west. After a few tenths of a mile, it passes Buttermilk Falls and reaches its confluence with the Susquehanna River.

Buttermilk Creek joins the Susquehanna River 208.58 miles (335.68 km) upriver of its mouth.

=== Tributaries ===
Buttermilk Creek has two named tributaries: Falls Creek and Beaver Creek. Falls Creek joins Buttermilk Creek 2.00 miles (3.22 km) upstream of its mouth and its watershed has an area of 7.27 square miles (18.8 km^{2}). Beaver Creek joins Buttermilk Creek 2.58 miles (4.15 km) upstream of its mouth and drains an area of 9.81 square miles (25.4 km^{2}).

== Hydrology and climate ==
Buttermilk Creek is not designated as an impaired waterbody. Along with Gardner Creek, it is one of only two perennial streams in the Ransom quadrangle.

In the early 1900s, the average annual rate of precipitation in the watershed of Buttermilk Creek was 35 to 40 inches (89 to 102 cm).

== Geography and geology ==
The elevation near the mouth of Buttermilk Creek is 564 feet (172 m) above sea level. The elevation of the creek's source is between 1,140 and 1,160 feet (350 and 350 m) above sea level.

The topography of the watershed of Buttermilk Creek was described as "rough and hilly" in the Water Resources Inventory Report in 1921. The creek's valley is surrounded by steep hills that have been rounded by glaciation. The creek's channel is sinuous and flows through rock formations consisting of sandstone.

In the distant past, accumulating piles of glacial drift caused Buttermilk Creek to alter its course and flow over a series of cliffs as a waterfall. The total height of the cliffs is 155 feet (47 m) and they consist of sandstone of the Catskill Formation. The falls, which are known as Buttermilk Falls, are a series of low waterfalls that are an "excellent example of the type" and "the most outstanding example of this kind of waterfall system in Pennsylvania". Each individual waterfall ranges in height from 10 to 35 feet (3.0 to 10.7 m). The falls are located 0.3 miles (0.48 km) upstream of the creek's mouth. Buttermilk Creek flows through a narrow defile in its lower reaches. In some reaches, the creek flows through bottom lands and swamps in glacial drift.

Above the Buttermilk Falls, Buttermilk Creek flows over glacial drift. The creek is a relatively small stream with headwaters in a mountain lake.

The surficial geology along most of Buttermilk Creek consists of alluvium. However, in the creek's upper reaches, Wisconinan Till makes up all the surficial geology along it. In the lower and middle reaches, there are also small patches of Wisconsinan Outwash, which contains stratified sand and gravel, and Wisconsinan Ice-Contact Stratified Drift, which contains stratified sand and gravel, as well as some boulders. Bedrock also occurs in the surficial geology near the creek's mouth. Additionally, there are a few patches of alluvial fan, peat bogs and other wetlands, lakes, and sandstone and shale pits in the watershed.

== Watershed ==
The watershed of Buttermilk Creek has an area of 26.1 square miles (68 km^{2}). The creek is entirely within the United States Geological Survey quadrangle of Ransom. Its watershed is mainly in southwestern Lackawanna County and southeastern Wyoming County.

Geary Enterprises has permission to withdraw no more than 99,000 gallons of water per day from Buttermilk Creek. This company is a sand and gravel company that uses the water for drilling gas wells.

There are a number of lakes in the watershed of Buttermilk Creek. Major ones include Fords Lake on Buttermilk Creek itself and Lake Winola, which has an area of approximately 190 acres (77 ha), on one of its tributaries. A 140-acre (57 ha) reservoir on the creek 0.25 miles (0.40 km) upstream of its mouth was proposed in the 1970s. It could have ultimately provided 109,000 recreation days per year.

== History ==
Buttermilk Creek was entered into the Geographic Names Information System on August 2, 1979. Its identifier in the Geographic Names Information System is 1198508.

In the mid-1800s, the watershed of Buttermilk Creek was mostly wild and sparsely populated. However, there was a small village at the creek's mouth, with some flour mills and a factory. The area in the vicinity of Buttermilk Falls is now developed, with a village known as Falls being located at the creek's mouth.

In the early 1900s, the main industries in the watershed of Buttermilk Creek included agriculture and a summer resort. Major settlements in the watershed at this time included Mill City, Falls, and Lake Winola. Their populations were 415, 155, and 60, respectively.

A steel stringer/multi-beam or girder bridge carrying T362/Creek Flats Road over Buttermilk Creek was built in 1916 in Falls and was repaired in 1982. This bridge is 30.8 feet (9.4 m) long. A concrete slab bridge carrying State Route 2027 over the creek was built in 1958 in Falls Township, Wyoming County and is 24.0 feet (7.3 m) long. A wood stringer/multi-beam or girder bridge carrying T373 over the creek was built in 1978 in Falls Township, Wyoming County and is 32.2 feet (9.8 m) long. A prestressed box beam or girders bridge carrying State Route 2015 was constructed across the creek in 1990 in Falls Township, Wyoming County and is 60.0 feet (18.3 m) long. A bridge over the creek in Falls Township was damaged during flooding in 2006. In 2007, Quality Engineering Solutions came to be in charge of a bridge restoration project funded by the Federal Emergency Management Agency for that bridge.

== Biology ==
The drainage basin of Buttermilk Creek is designated as a Coldwater Fishery and a Migratory Fishery. Hemlock trees occur along the creek in its lower reaches.

Buttermilk Falls on Buttermilk Creek are listed as a locally significant area on the Wyoming County Natural Areas Inventory.

== See also ==
- Whitelock Creek, next tributary of the Susquehanna River going downriver
- Fitch Creek, next tributary of the Susquehanna river going upriver
- List of rivers of Pennsylvania
