= Jackson Creek (Susquehanna River tributary) =

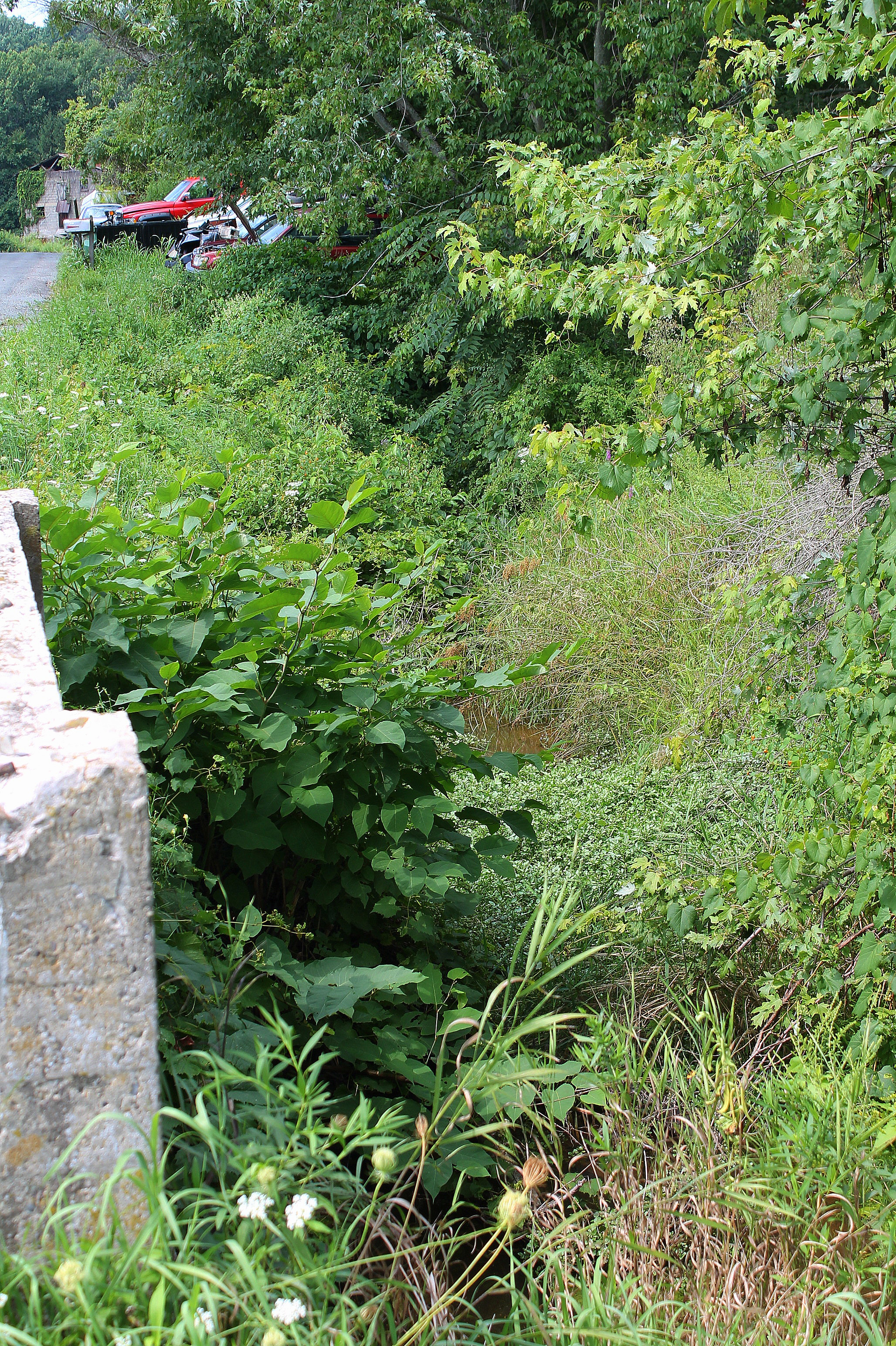
- Jackson Creek obscured by vegetation

Physical characteristics
- Source
  - location: broad valley between Avery Mountain and Osterhout Mountain in Tunkhannock Township, Wyoming County, Pennsylvania
  - elevation: between 840 and 860 feet (256 and 262 m)
- Mouth
  - location: Susquehanna River in Tunkhannock Township, Wyoming County, Pennsylvania
  - coordinates: 41°30′38″N 75°54′48″W
  - elevation: 584 ft (178 m)
- Length: 1.4 mi (2.3 km)

Basin features
- Progression: Susquehanna River → Chesapeake Bay

Jackson Creek is a tributary of the Susquehanna River in Wyoming County, Pennsylvania, in the United States. It is approximately 1.4 miles (2.3 km) long and flows through Tunkhannock Township. Mountains in the creek's vicinity include Avery Mountain and Osterhout Mountain. The surficial geology in the vicinity of these mountains includes Wisconsinan Till and bedrock, among other things. Jackson Creek is classified as a Coldwater Fishery and a Migratory Fishery.

== Course ==
Jackson Creek begins in a broad valley between Avery Mountain and Osterhout Mountain in Tunkhannock Township. It flows south-southwest for a few tenths of a mile before turning south-southeast. After several tenths of a mile, the creek turns east-southeast and passes through a wetland and an unnamed pond or small lake before turning south, crossing Pennsylvania Route 92, and reaching its confluence with the Susquehanna River between two river bends in the river.

=== Tributaries ===
The National Map does not show any tributaries to Jackson Creek, named or unnamed.

== Geography and geology ==
The elevation near the mouth of Jackson Creek is 587 feet (179 m) above sea level. The elevation of the creek's source is between 840 and 860 feet (256 and 262 m) above sea level.

Avery Mountain, which has an elevation of slightly more than 1,400 feet (430 m) above sea level, occurs in the vicinity of Jackson Creek, as does Osterhout Mountain, which has an elevation of well over 1,800 feet (550 m) above sea level. The surficial geology in the vicinity of these mountains mainly consists of Wisconsinan Till (a glacial till) and bedrock consisting of sandstone and shale. Alluvium (containing stratified sand, silt, and gravel), Wisconsinan Outwash, alluvial terrace, wetlands, fill, and lakes also occur in the area.

== Watershed and biology ==
Jackson Creek is entirely within the United States Geological Survey quadrangle of Tunkhannock.

A company known as Williams Field Services, LLC. has been issued an erosion and sediment control permit for which one of the receiving streams is Jackson Creek. The creek flows alongside Lane Hill Road for a significant portion of its length.

Jackson Creek is classified as a Coldwater Fishery and a Migratory Fishery.

== History ==
Jackson Creek was entered into the Geographic Names Information System on January 1, 1990 because it appears in Israel C. White's 1883 book The geology of the North Branch Susquehanna River Region in the six counties of Wyoming, Lackawanna, Luzerne, Columbia, Montour and Northumberland. Its identifier in the Geographic Names Information System is 1202093.

== See also ==
- Mill Run (Susquehanna River), next tributary of the Susquehanna River going downriver
- Bowman Creek, next tributary of the Susquehanna River going upriver
- List of rivers of Pennsylvania
