= Keeler Creek =

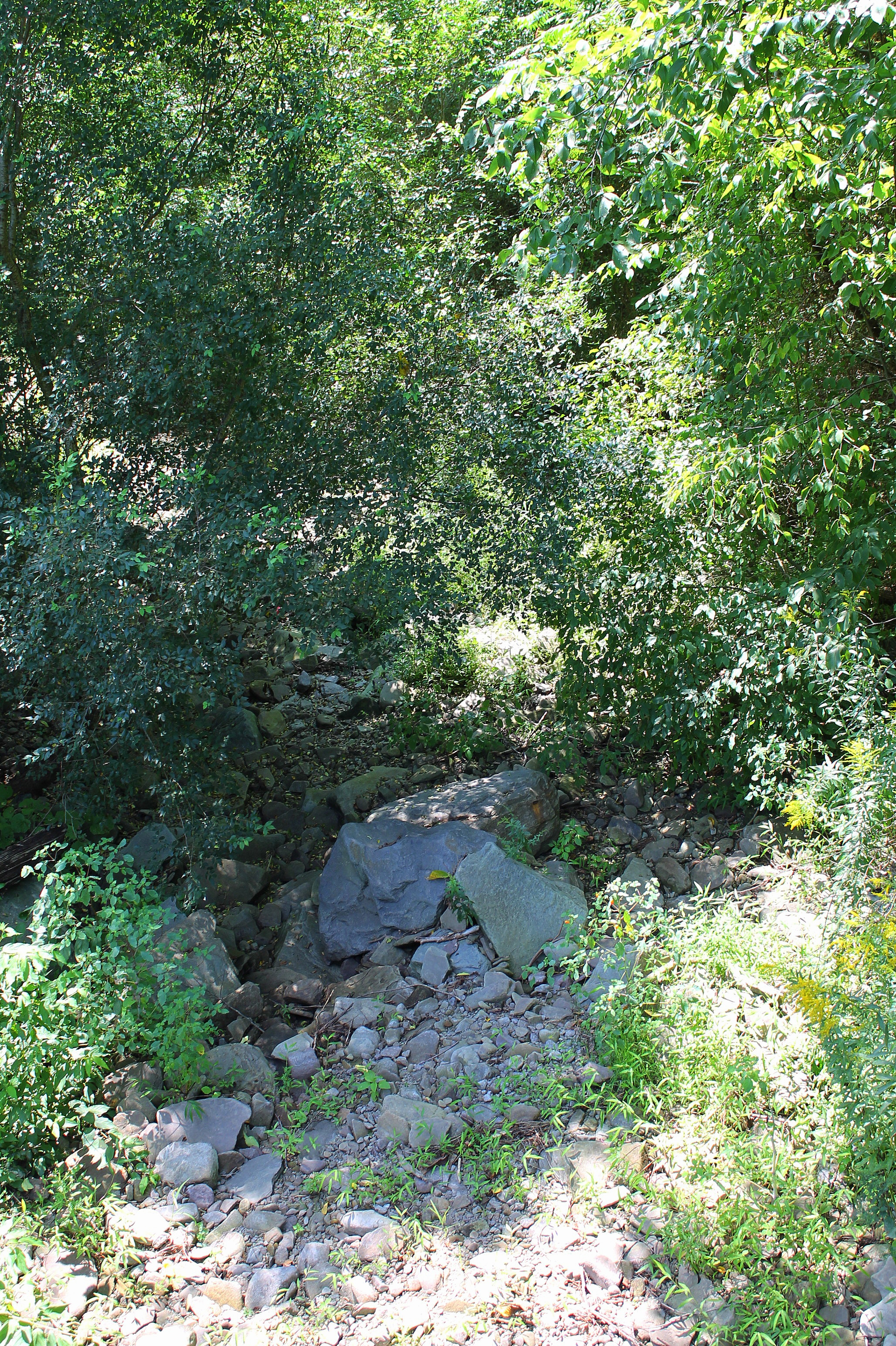
- Keeler Creek looking downstream in its lower reaches

Physical characteristics
- Source
  - location: valley in Falls Township, Wyoming County, Pennsylvania
  - elevation: between 980 and 1,000 feet (299 and 305 m)
- Mouth
  - location: Susquehanna River in Falls Township, Wyoming County, Pennsylvania
  - coordinates: 41°26′00″N 75°50′45″W
  - elevation: 554 ft (169 m)
- Length: 2.0 mi (3.2 km)
- Basin size: 1.86 mi^{2} (4.8 km^{2})

Basin features
- Progression: Susquehanna River → Chesapeake Bay

Keeler Creek is a tributary of the Susquehanna River in Wyoming County, Pennsylvania, in the United States. It is approximately 2.0 miles (3.2 km) long and flows through Falls Township. The watershed of the creek has an area of 1.86 square miles (4.8 km^{2}). The stream is not designated as an impaired waterbody. Its drainage basin is a Coldwater Fishery and a Migratory Fishery.

== Course ==
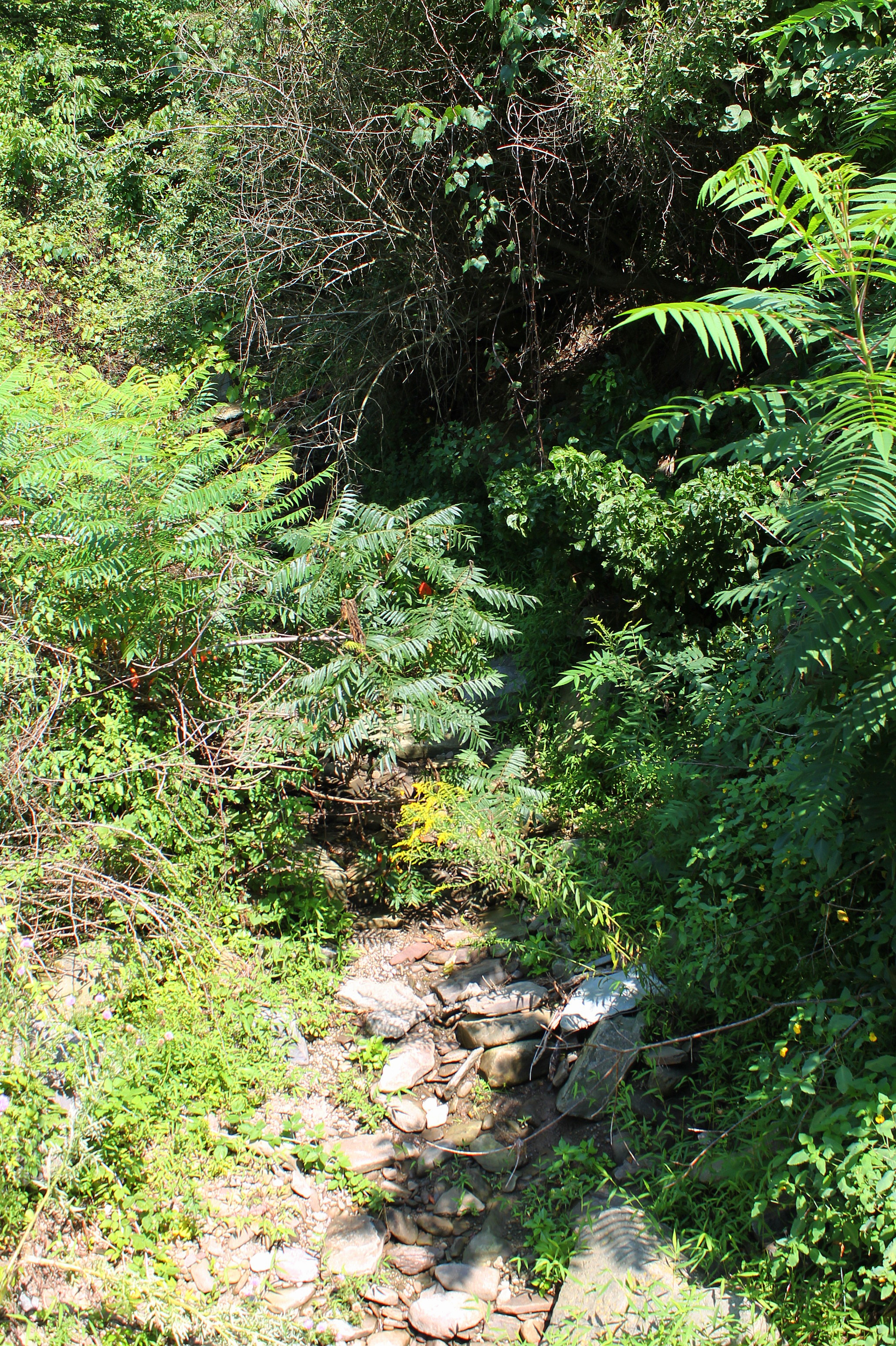
Keeler Creek looking upstream

Keeler Creek begins in a valley in Falls Township. It flows southwest for a few tenths of a mile before turning west-southwest. After a few tenths of a mile, the creek's valley narrows and it turns southwest for a few tenths of a mile. It then leaves its valley and turns south for a few tenths of a mile before turning southwest. A few tenths of a mile further downstream, the creek reaches its confluence with the Susquehanna River.

Keeler Creek joins the Susquehanna River 206.56 miles (332.43 km) upriver of its mouth.

== Hydrology ==
Keeler Creek is not designated as an impaired waterbody.

== Geography and geology ==
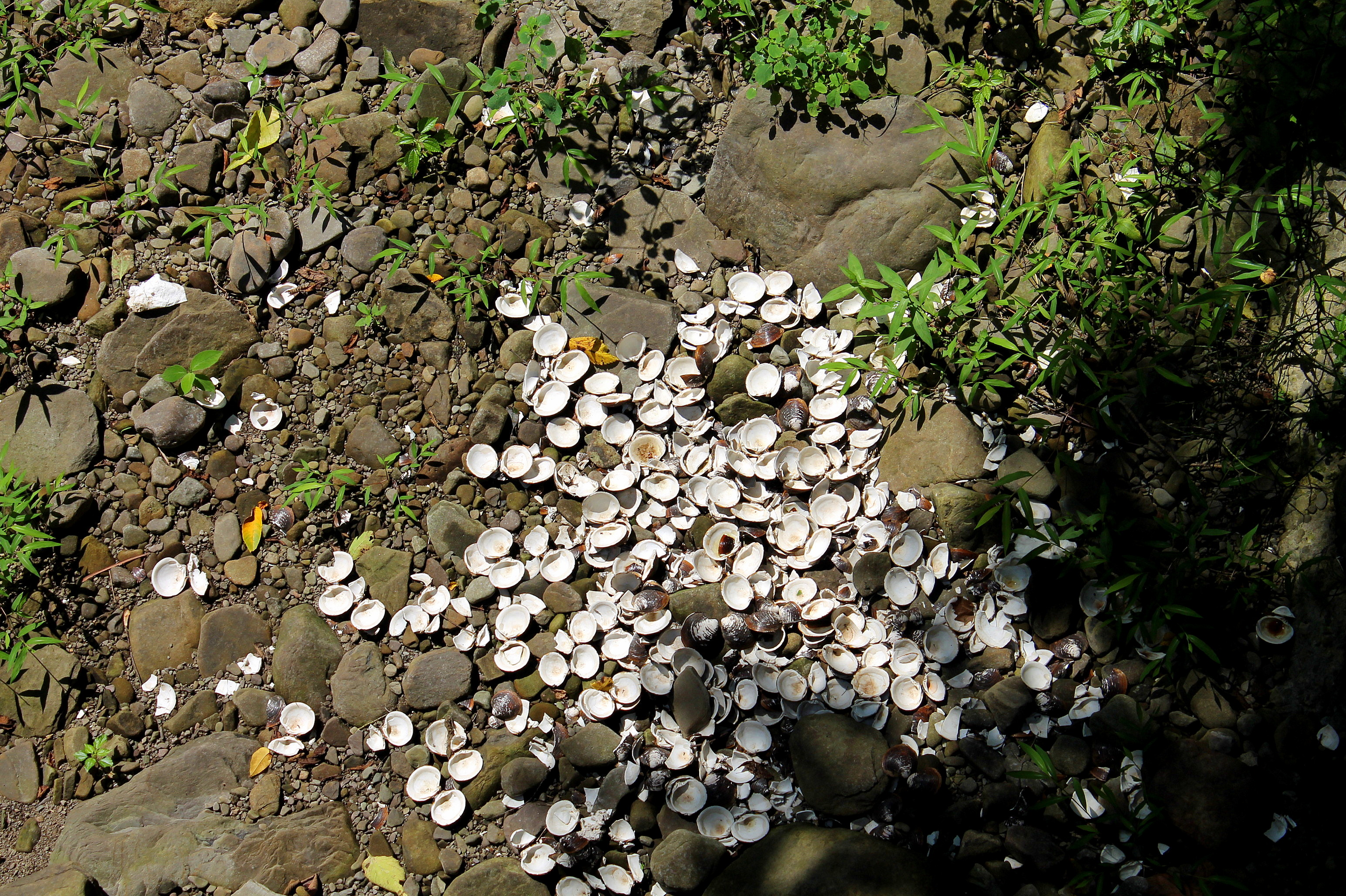
The streambed of Keeler Creek, including many clam shells

The elevation near the mouth of Keeler Creek is 554 feet (169 m) above sea level. The elevation of the creek's source is between 980 and 1,000 feet (299 and 305 m) above sea level.

The surficial geology in the vicinity of the lower reaches of Keeler Creek mainly consist of alluvium (containing stratified sand, silt, and gravel), Wisconsinan Outwash, and sand and gravel pits with steep sides that can be dozens of feet deep. Further upstream, the surficial geology mainly consists of a glacial or resedimented till known as Wisconsinan Till. However, a small patch of alluvium is also present in this reach.

Keeler Creek is a small stream that in 1827 was described as being able to support mills.

== Watershed ==
The watershed of Keeler Creek has an area of 1.86 square miles (4.8 km^{2}). The stream is entirely within the United States Geological Survey quadrangle of Ransom. Its designated use is for aquatic life. Most of the creek's watershed is in Falls Township, Wyoming County. However, part of the watershed is in Newton Township, Lackawanna County.

Major roads in the watershed of Keeler Creek include State Route 2013 and State Route 2029.

== History ==
Keeler Creek was entered into the Geographic Names Information System on August 2, 1979. Its identifier in the Geographic Names Information System is 1198964.

The North Branch Canal historically had an aqueduct that crossed Keeler Creek. It was 34 feet (10 m) long and had two spans.

== Biology ==
The drainage basin of Keeler Creek is designated as a Coldwater Fishery and a Migratory Fishery.

== See also ==
- Dymond Creek, next tributary of the Susquehanna River going downriver
- Whitelock Creek, next tributary of the Susquehanna River going upriver
- List of rivers of Pennsylvania
