= Falls Township, Pennsylvania =

Falls Township is the name of two places in the U.S. state of Pennsylvania:

- Falls Township, Bucks County, Pennsylvania
- Falls Township, Wyoming County, Pennsylvania
