= Fitch Creek =

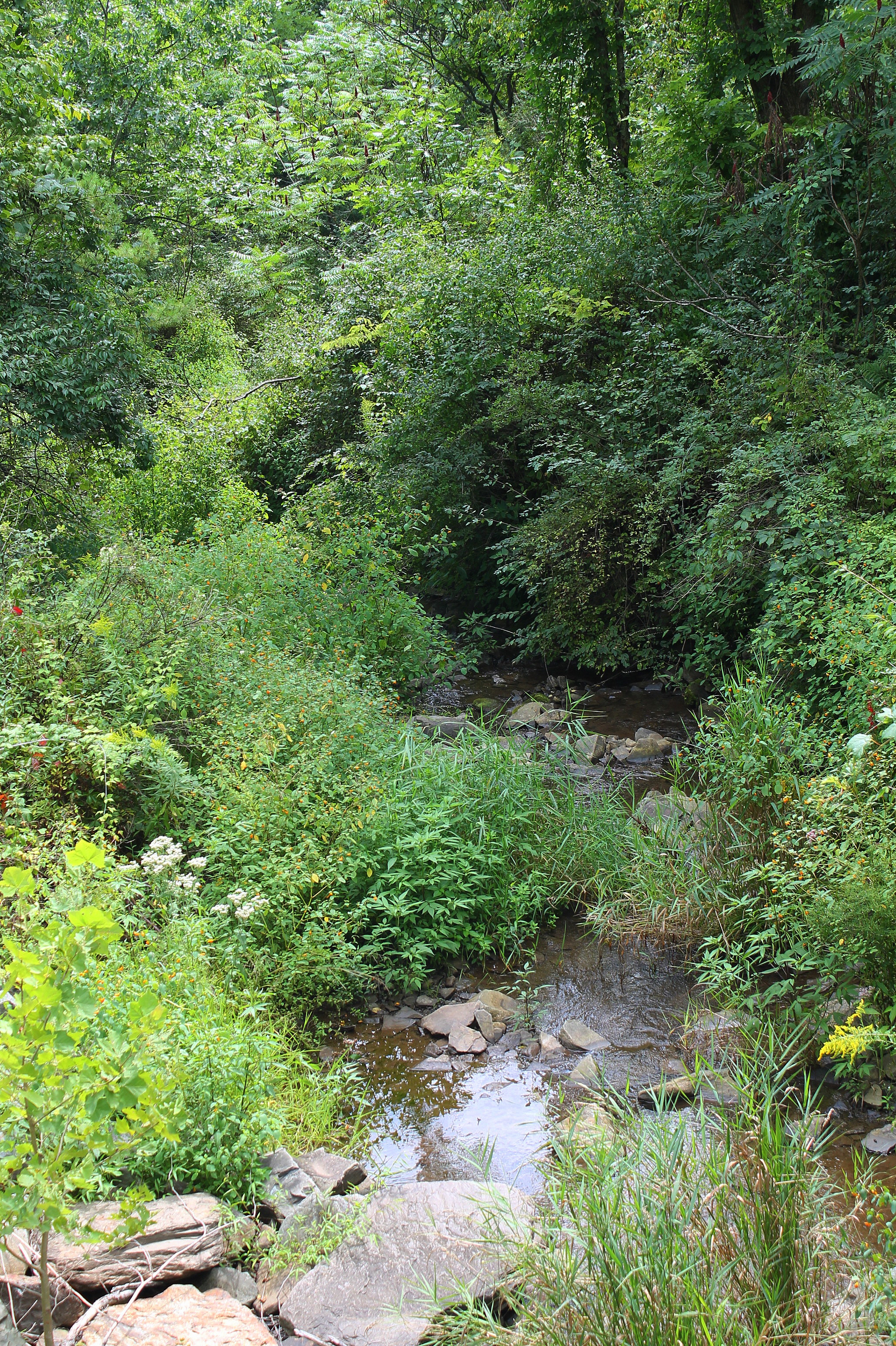
- Fitch Creek looking downstream

- Location within Pennsylvania

Physical characteristics
- Source
  - location: unnamed lake in Falls Township, Wyoming County, Pennsylvania
  - elevation: between 980 and 1,000 feet (299 and 305 m)
- Mouth
  - location: Susquehanna River in Falls Township, Wyoming County, Pennsylvania
  - coordinates: 41°27′51″N 75°51′56″W
  - elevation: 554 ft (169 m)
- Length: 2.0 mi (3.2 km)
- Basin size: 2.52 sq mi (6.5 km^{2})

Basin features
- Progression: Susquehanna River → Chesapeake Bay
- Tributaries
  - right: one unnamed tributary

Fitch Creek is a tributary of the Susquehanna River in Wyoming County, Pennsylvania, in the United States. It is approximately 2.0 miles (3.2 km) long and flows through Falls Township. The watershed of the creek has an area of 2.52 square miles (6.5 km^{2}). The creek is not designated as an impaired waterbody. Its drainage basin is designated as a Coldwater Fishery and a Migratory Fishery.

== Course ==
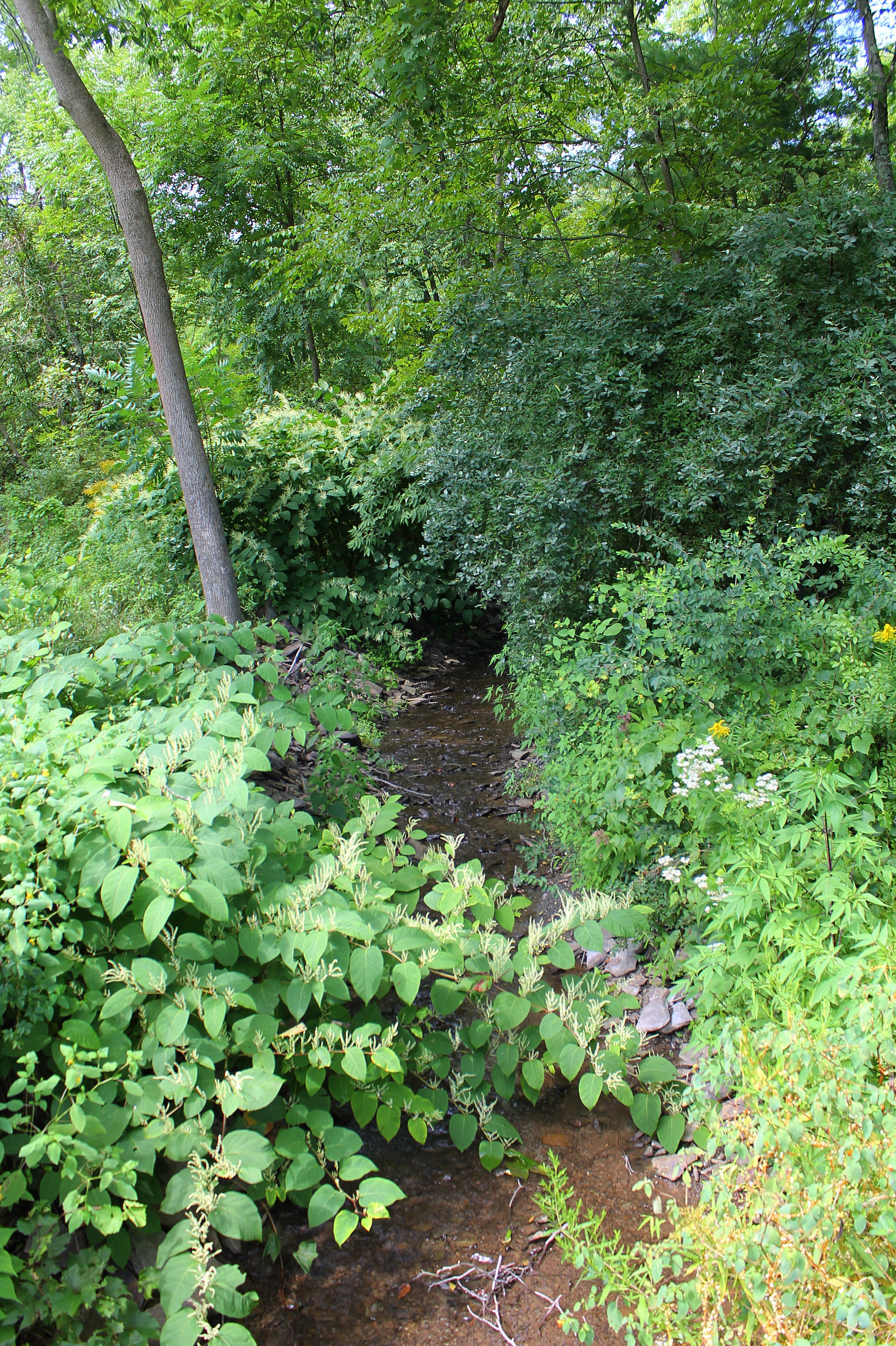
Fitch Creek looking upstream

Fitch Creek begins in an unnamed lake in Falls Township. It flows south for a few tenths of a mile before and enters a valley. It then turns southwest for several tenths of a mile and its valley broadens. At this point, the creek turns south-southwest for a short distance before turning southeast for a few tenths of a mile and crossing Pennsylvania Route 92. It then heads in an easterly direction for several tenths of a mile before reaching its confluence with the Susquehanna River.

Fitch Creek joins the Susquehanna River 209.40 miles (337.00 km) upriver of its mouth.

=== Tributaries ===
Fitch Creek has no named tributaries. However, it does have an unnamed tributary, which flows down a mountain to join Fitch Creek.

== Hydrology ==
Fitch Creek is not designated as an impaired waterbody.

== Geography and geology ==
The elevation near the mouth of Fitch Creek is 554 feet (169 m) above sea level. The elevation of the creek's source is between 980 and 1,000 feet (299 and 305 m) above sea level.

The surficial geology near the mouth of Fitch Creek mainly consists of alluvium, Wisconsinan Outwash, and sand and gravel pits. Further upstream, Wisconsinan Till is most prevalent, but there are also a few patches of Wisconsinan Ice-Contact Stratified Drift, bedrock, and lakes.

A hill known as Post Hill is located to the east of Fitch Creek.

== Watershed ==
The watershed of Fitch Creek has an area of 2.52 square miles (6.5 km^{2}). The creek is entirely within the United States Geological Survey quadrangle of Ransom.

A waterfall known as the Fitch Creek Falls is on Fitch Creek. One reach of the creek flows alongside a road known as Evergreen Road at a distance of approximately 100 feet (30 m).

The designated use of Fitch Creek is for aquatic life.

== History ==
Fitch Creek was entered into the Geographic Names Information System on August 2, 1979. Its identifier in the Geographic Names Information System is 1199869.

A bridge carrying Pennsylvania Route 92 crosses Fitch Creek. As of October 2014, a bridge replacement project has been programmed for the bridge.

== Biology ==
The drainage basin of Fitch Creek is designated as a Coldwater Fishery and a Migratory Fishery.

== See also ==
- Buttermilk Creek (Susquehanna River), next tributary of the Susquehanna River going downriver
- Martin Creek (Susquehanna River), next tributary of the Susquehanna River going upriver
- List of rivers of Pennsylvania
