= Beaver Creek (Buttermilk Creek tributary) =

Physical characteristics
- Source
  - location: wetland in West Abington Township, Lackawanna County, Pennsylvania
  - elevation: between 1,160 and 1,180 feet (354 and 360 m)
- Mouth
  - location: Buttermilk Creek in Falls Township, Wyoming County, Pennsylvania
  - coordinates: 41°29′01″N 75°49′49″W
  - elevation: 765 ft (233 m)
- Length: 5.5 mi (8.9 km)
- Basin size: 9.81 mi^{2} (25.4 km^{2})

Basin features
- Progression: Buttermilk Creek → Susquehanna River → Chesapeake Bay
- Tributaries
  - right: five unnamed tributaries

Beaver Creek is a tributary of Buttermilk Creek in Lackawanna County and Wyoming County, in Pennsylvania, in the United States. It is approximately 5.5 miles (8.9 km) long and flows through West Abington Township in Lackawanna County and Overfield Township and Falls Township in Wyoming County. The watershed of the creek has an area of 9.81 square miles (25.4 km^{2}) and contains Lake Winola. The creek is not designated as an impaired waterbody. The surficial geology in its vicinity consists of alluvium, Wisconsinan Till, Wisconsinan Outwash, alluvial fan, Wisconsinan Ice-Contact Stratified Drift, Wisconsinan Bouldery Till, wetlands, and peat bogs.

== Course ==
Beaver Creek begins in a wetland in West Abington Township, Lackawanna County. It flows southwest for a few tenths of a mile, receiving a very short unnamed tributary from the right along the way, and passes through a lake before turning northwest. Several tenths of a mile further downstream, the creek receives another unnamed tributary from the right and turns southwest, passing through a wetland and entering Overfield Township, Wyoming County. In this township, the creek continues flowing southwest, passing through more wetlands and receiving an unnamed tributary from the right. It continues flowing in a generally southwesterly direction along the border between Overfield Township and Falls Township for some distance, receiving two more unnamed tributaries from the right. It then turns south for several tenths of a mile and reaches its confluence with Buttermilk Creek.

Beaver Creek joins Buttermilk Creek 2.58 miles (4.15 km) upstream of its mouth.

== Hydrology ==
Beaver Creek is not designated as an impaired waterbody.

== Geography and geology ==
The elevation near the mouth of Beaver Creek is 764 feet (233 m) above sea level. The elevation of the creek's source is between 1,160 and 1,180 feet (354 and 360 m) above sea level.

The surficial geology along the lower reaches of Beaver Creek mainly consists of alluvium, although Wisconsinan Till also occurs in the area. There are also a few small patches of Wisconsinan Outwash and alluvial fan. Further upstream, alluvium and Wisconsinan Till are also prevalent. However, there is also a patch of Wisconsinan Ice-Contact Stratified Drift, another patch of Wisconsinan Bouldery Till, and a few patches of wetlands and peat bogs.

== Watershed ==
The watershed of Beaver Creek has an area of 9.81 square miles (25.4 km^{2}). The mouth of the creek is in the United States Geological Survey quadrangle of Ransom. However, its source is in the quadrangle of Factoryville.

A dam known as the Winola Mill Pond Dam is in the watershed of Beaver Creek, on one of its tributaries. Ronco Northeast, Inc. once applied for a permit to maintain fill in 0.3 acres (0.12 ha) of wetlands along Buttermilk Creek, near the mouth of Beaver Creek. Lake Winola itself is on a tributary of the creek.

== History ==
Beaver Creek was entered into the Geographic Names Information System on August 2, 1979. Its identifier in the Geographic Names Information System is 1198387.

A concrete tee beam bridge was constructed across Beaver Creek in 1924. It is 41.0 feet (12.5 m) long and is located in Falls Township, Wyoming County.

== See also ==
- Falls Creek (Buttermilk Creek), next tributary of Buttermilk Creek going downstream
- List of rivers of Pennsylvania
