= Mill Run (Susquehanna River tributary) =

Mill Run Osterhout Creek, Osterhouts Creek
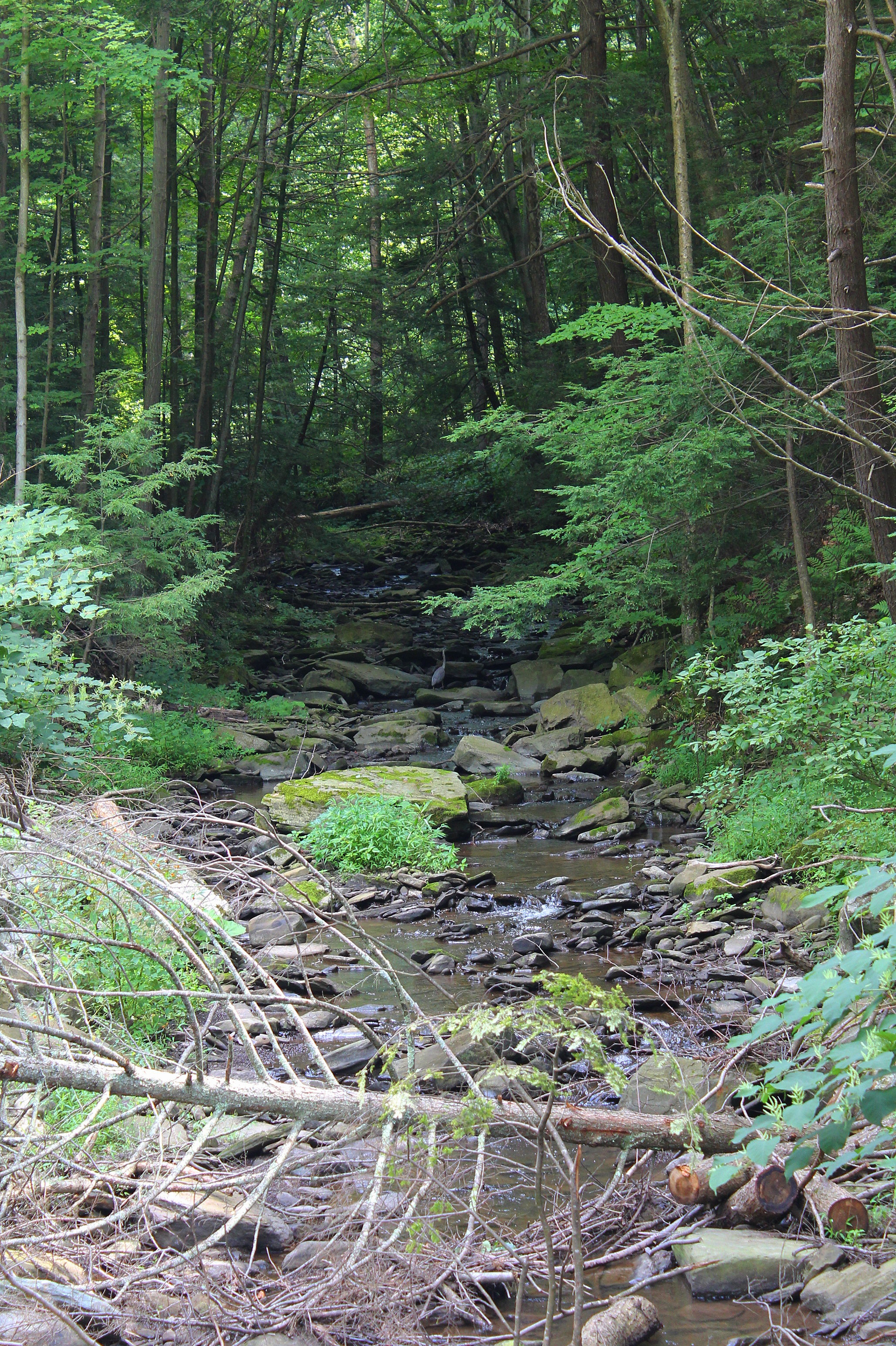
- Mill Run looking upstream

Physical characteristics
- Source
  - location: lake between Middle Mountain and Osterhout Mountain in Tunkhannock Township, Wyoming County, Pennsylvania
  - elevation: between 940 and 960 feet (287 and 293 m)
- Mouth
  - location: Susquehanna River in Tunkhannock Township, Wyoming County, Pennsylvania
  - coordinates: 41°30′27″N 75°54′02″W
  - elevation: 574 ft (175 m)
- Length: 3.5 mi (5.6 km)

Basin features
- Progression: Susquehanna River → Chesapeake Bay

Mill Run (also known as Osterhout Creek or Osterhouts Creek) is a tributary of the Susquehanna River in Wyoming County, Pennsylvania, in the United States. It is approximately 3.5 miles (5.6 km) long and flows through Tunkhannock Township and Overfield Township. The stream is not designated as an impaired waterbody. In its upper reaches, it flows through glacial drift, while in its lower reaches, it passes over a waterfall. Lakes in the stream's watershed include Flow Pond.

A number of bridges have been constructed over Mill Run. A sawmill also used to be located on the stream. The stream's drainage basin is designated as a Coldwater Fishery and a Migratory Fishery.

== Course ==
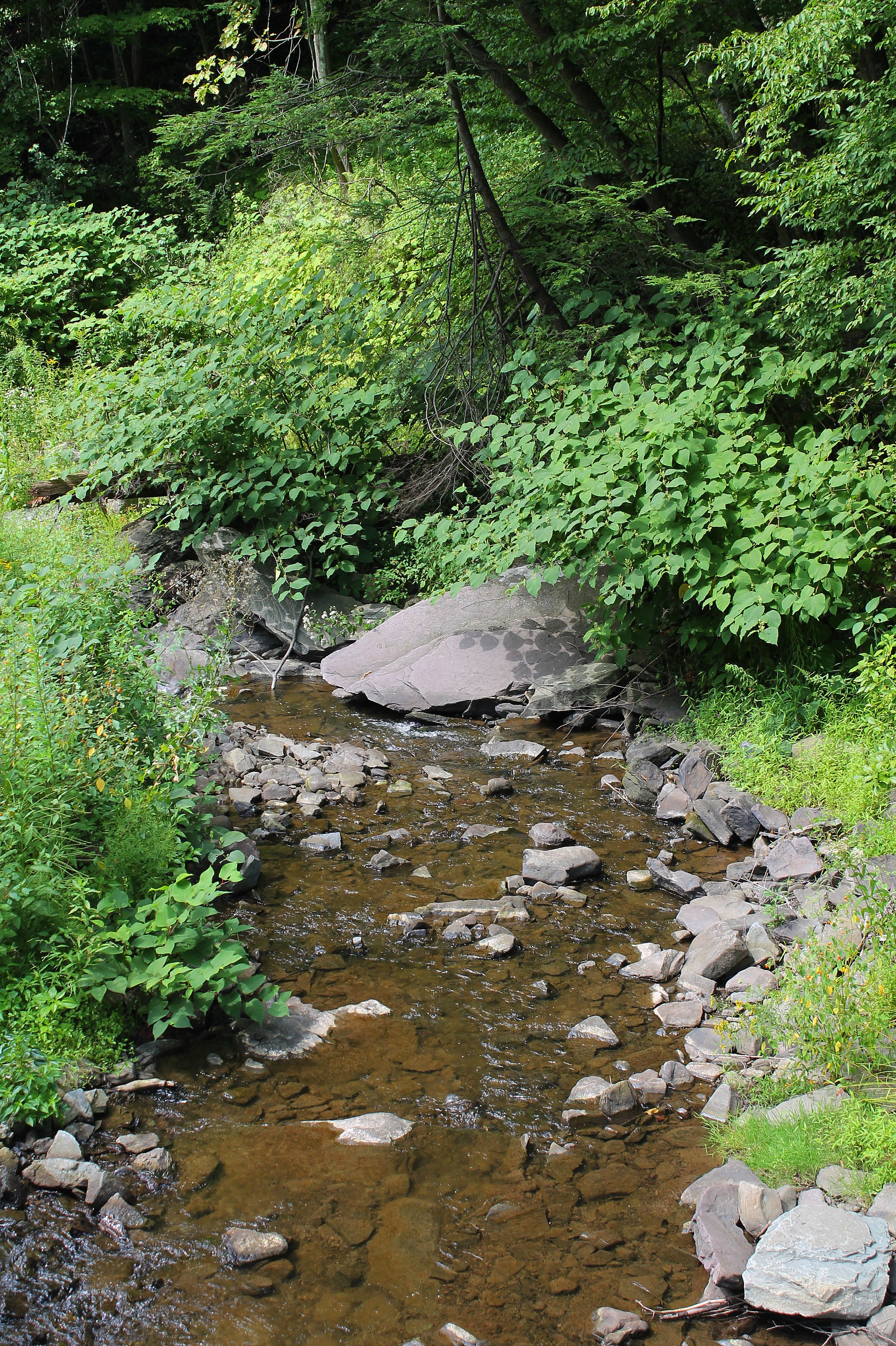
Mill Run looking downstream

Mill Run begins in a lake between Middle Mountain and Osterhout Mountain in Tunkhannock Township. It flows in a southerly direction for several tenths of a mile before entering Flow Pond. From the southern end of the pond, it flows south-southwest past German Hill for several tenths of a mile before entering a valley between Osterhout Mountain and Greenwood Hill. Here, the stream turns west and flows alongside Pennsylvania Route 307 for several tenths of a mile, crossing it twice. It then turns south-southwest for a few tenths of a mile, crossing Pennsylvania Route 307, leaving its valley, crossing Pennsylvania Route 92, and reaching its confluence with the Susquehanna River at La Grange Island.

Mill Run joins the Susquehanna River 215.14 miles (346.23 km) upriver of its mouth.

== Geography and geology ==
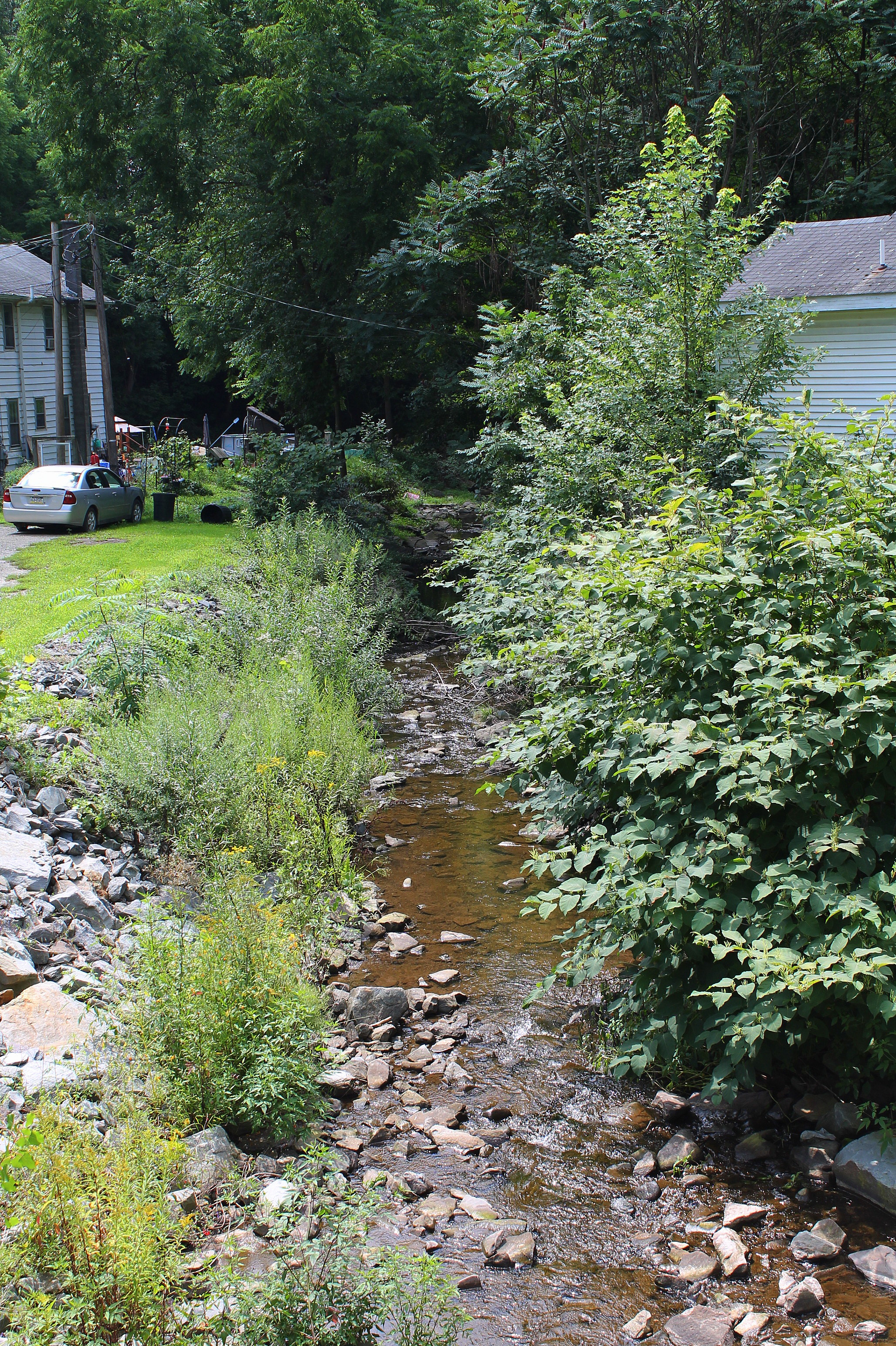
Mill Run looking downstream

The elevation near the mouth of Mill Run is 574 feet (175 m) above sea level. The elevation of the stream's source is between 940 and 960 feet (287 and 293 m) above sea level. The width of Mill Run at the outlet of Flow Pond is 10 feet (3.0 m) and its depth is 1 foot (0.30 m). At the inlet of the pond, the stream is 6 feet (1.8 m) wide and 1 foot (0.30 m) deep. The upper reaches of the creek are relatively slow-moving.

At the outflow of Flow Pond, the channel of Mill Run is clean and rocky. Upstream of the pond, the channel is clean and marshy. In its upper reaches, the stream flows over glacial drift in a buried valley. However, it cuts through the drift approximately 0.75 miles (1.21 km) upstream of its mouth.

In the lower reaches of Mill Run, the stream flows over some cascades with a height of 30 feet (9.1 m). In an 1887 book, these cascades were said to give the stream "splendid" water power. A preglacial valley also occurs in the stream's watershed. The watershed is separated from Lake Winola by a wall of glacial drift with a height of 25 feet (7.6 m).

Rock types in the vicinity of Mill Run include green and greenish-gray sandstone, red shale, and others. The surficial geology in the vicinity of the lower reaches of Mill Run mainly consists of Wisconsinan Till. However, there is alluvium and fill near its mouth.

== Hydrology and watershed ==
Mill Run is not designated as an impaired waterbody.

The mouth of Mill Run is in the United States Geological Survey quadrangle of Tunkhannock. However, its source is in the quadrangle of Factoryville. The designated use of the stream is for aquatic life.

An artificial lake known as Flow Pond or Osterhout Lake is situated on Mill Run. The lake has an area of 30.4 acres (12.3 ha).

== History ==
Mill Run was entered into the Geographic Names Information System on August 30, 1990. Its identifier in the Geographic Names Information System is 1168013. The stream is also known as Osterhout Creek or Osterhouts Creek. The former name appears in a 1946 United States Geological Survey map, while the latter name appears in Israel C. White's 1883 book The geology of the North Branch Susquehanna River Region in the six counties of Wyoming, Lackawanna, Luzerne, Columbia, Montour and Northumberland.

Historically a sawmill known as Osterhout and Jenkins Sawmill existed on Mill Run. A vein of semi-bituminous coal was discovered near the stream in 1877.

Two concrete tee beam bridges carrying Pennsylvania Route 307 over Mill Run were constructed in Tunkhannock Township in 1925 and are 34.1 and 46.9 feet (10.4 and 14.3 m) long. A concrete frame bridge carrying the same highway over the stream was built in Tunkhannock Township in 1992 and is 23.0 feet (7.0 m) long.

In January 2014, bridge replacement work on two bridges crossing Mil Run was scheduled for completion by December of that year.

== Biology ==
The drainage basin of Mill Run is designated as a Coldwater Fishery and a Migratory Fishery. The Lehigh Valley Railroad historically stocked the stream with brook trout.

== See also ==
- Moneypenny Creek, net tributary of the Susquehanna River going downriver
- Jackson Creek (Susquehanna River), next tributary of the Susquehanna River going upriver
- List of rivers of Pennsylvania
