= Falls Creek (Buttermilk Creek tributary) =

Falls Creek Falls Creek No. 2

Physical characteristics
- Source
  - location: Newton Township, Lackawanna County, Pennsylvania
  - elevation: between 1,200 and 1,220 feet (366 and 372 m)
- Mouth
  - location: Buttermilk Creek in Falls Township, Wyoming County, Pennsylvania
  - coordinates: 41°28′42″N 75°49′59″W
  - elevation: 748 ft (228 m)
- Length: 6.0 mi (9.7 km)
- Basin size: 7.27 mi^{2} (18.8 km^{2})

Basin features
- Progression: Buttermilk Creek → Susquehanna River → Chesapeake Bay
- Tributaries
  - left: two unnamed tributaries
  - right: one unnamed tributary

Falls Creek (also known as Falls Creek No. 2) is a tributary of Buttermilk Creek in Lackawanna County and Wyoming County, in Pennsylvania, in the United States. It is approximately 6.0 miles (9.7 km) long and flows through Newton Township in Lackawanna County and Falls Township. The watershed of the creek has an area of 7.27 square miles (18.8 km^{2}). The creek is not designated as an impaired waterbody. The surficial geology in its vicinity consists mainly of alluvium, Wisconsinan Till, bedrock, Wisconsinan Ice-Contact Stratified Drift, Wisconsinan Outwash, and peat bogs. Several bridges have been constructed over the creek.

== Course ==
Falls Creek begins in Newton Township, Lackawanna County, near the border of South Abington Township. It flows west for several tenths of a mile and receives a short unnamed tributary from the right before turning southwest for more than a mile. The creek then meanders west-southwest past Griffin Hill for more than a mile before turning south-southwest and receiving an unnamed tributary from the left. It then turns west and exits Newton Township and Lackawanna County.

Upon exiting Lackawanna County, Falls Creek enters Falls Township, Wyoming County. It flows west-northwest for a short distance and receives another unnamed tributary from the left before turning north-northwest. After a short distance, the creek turns west-northwest for more than a mile, flowing past Square Top. The creek then turns west-northwest for a few tenths of a mile through the valley of Buttermilk Creek until it reaches its confluence with Buttermilk Creek.

Falls Creek joins Buttermilk Creek 2.00 miles (3.22 km) upstream of its mouth.

== Hydrology ==
Falls Creek is not designated as an impaired waterbody.

At the point where Falls Creek drains an area of 3.10 square miles (8.0 km^{2}), its peak annual discharge has a 10 percent chance of reaching 431 cubic feet per second (12.2 m^{3}/s). It has a 2 percent chance of reaching 734 cubic feet per second (20.8 m^{3}/s) and a 1 percent chance of reaching 886 cubic feet per second (25.1 m^{3}/s). The peak annual discharge has a 0.2 percent chance of reaching 1,307 cubic feet per second (37.0 m^{3}/s).

== Geography and geology ==
The elevation near the mouth of Falls Creek is 748 feet (228 m) above sea level. The elevation of the creek's source is between 1,200 and 1,220 feet (366 and 372 m) above sea level.

The surficial geology along the lower reaches of Falls Creek mainly consists of Wisconsinan Till, although there is alluvium (consisting of stratified sand and gravel) and Wisconsinan Outwash near its mouth. There are also patches of Wisconsinan Ice-Contact Stratified Drift and bedrock in some places. Further upstream, the surficial geology along the creek consists almost entirely of alluvium. However, large patches of Wisconsinan Till and bedrock, as well as smaller patches of Wisconsinan Ice-Contact Stratified Drift, Wisconsinan Outwash, and peat bogs occur in close proximity.

== Watershed ==
The watershed of Falls Creek has an area of 7.27 square miles (18.8 km^{2}). The mouth of the stream is in the United States Geological Survey quadrangle of Ransom. However, its source is in the quadrangle of Scranton.

Falls Creek is one of the main sources of flooding in Newton Township, Lackawanna County. Major floods on the creek can cause some localized flooding of structures. The designated use of the creek is for aquatic life.

== History ==
Falls Creek was entered into the Geographic Names Information System on August 2, 1979. Its identifier in the Geographic Names Information System is 1198722.

A steel stringer/multi-beam or girder bridge carrying T366 was constructed over Falls Creek in 1920 2 miles (3.2 km) southeast of Mill City. It is 23.0 feet (7.0 m) long and is closed to traffic. Another bridge of the same type was built over the creek in Newton Township, Lackawnana County in 1937. It is 24.9 feet (7.6 m) long and carries State Route 4037. A third of the same type was built over the creek for T362 in 1987. It is 36.1 feet (11.0 m) long and is located 1.4 miles (2.3 km) northeast of Falls.

== See also ==
- Beaver Creek (Buttermilk Creek), next tributary of Buttermilk Creek going upstream
- List of rivers of Pennsylvania
