= Martin Creek (Susquehanna River tributary) =

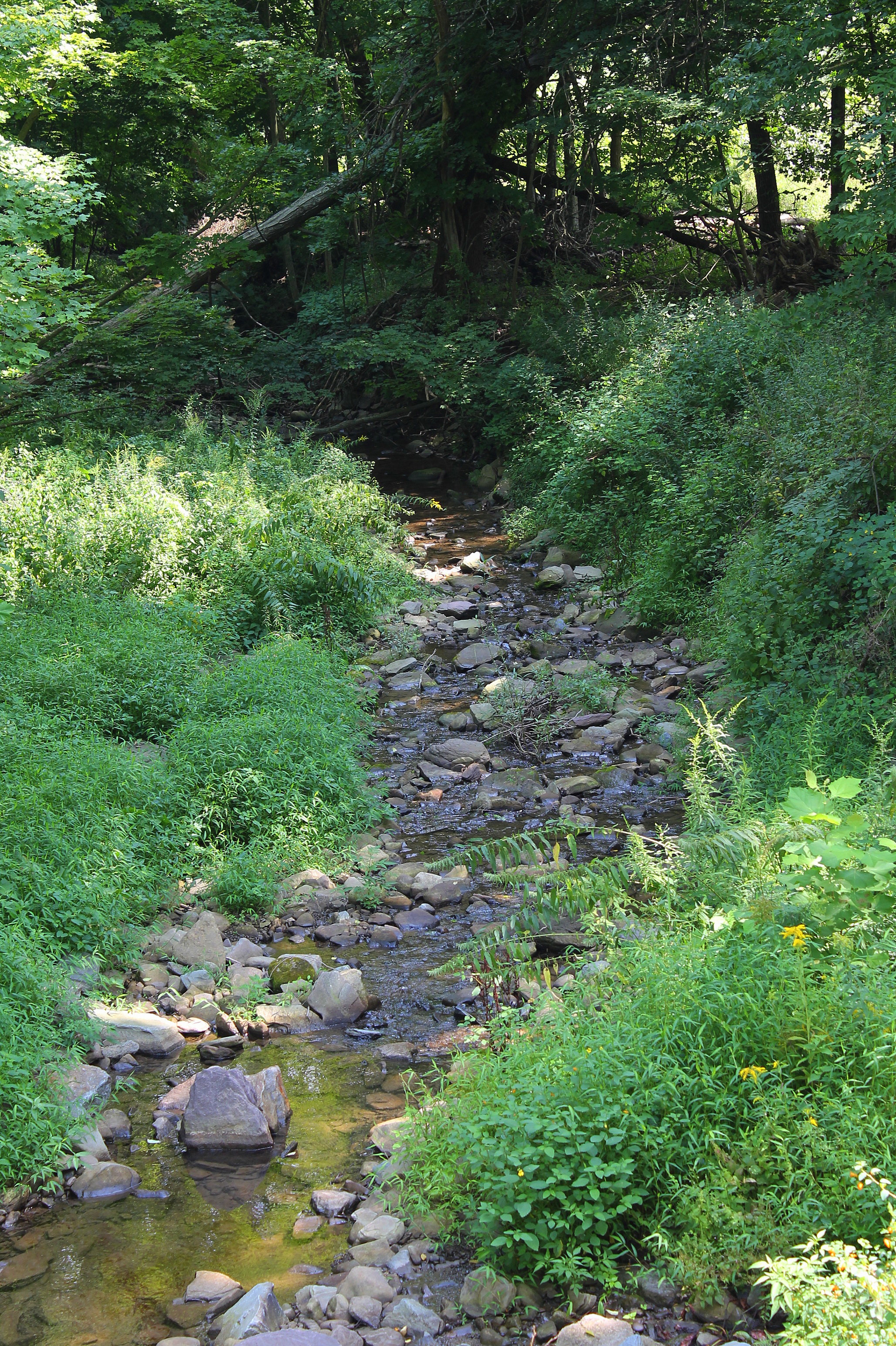
- Martin Creek looking upstream

Physical characteristics
- Source
  - location: valley in Northmoreland Township, Pennsylvania
  - elevation: between 1,040 and 1,060 feet (317 and 323 m)
- Mouth
  - location: Susquehanna River in Northmoreland Township, Pennsylvania
  - coordinates: 41°27′19″N 75°53′33″W
  - elevation: 558 ft (170 m)
- Length: 2.0 mi (3.2 km)
- Basin size: 2.25 sq mi (5.8 km^{2})

Basin features
- Progression: Susquehanna River → Chesapeake Bay
- Tributaries
  - left: one unnamed tributary

Martin Creek is a tributary of the Susquehanna River in Wyoming County, Pennsylvania, in the United States. It is approximately 2.0 miles (3.2 km) long and flows through Northmoreland Township and Eaton Township. The watershed of the creek has an area of 2.25 square miles (5.8 km^{2}). It is designated as a Coldwater Fishery and a Migratory Fishery. The creek is not designated as an impaired waterbody.

== Course ==
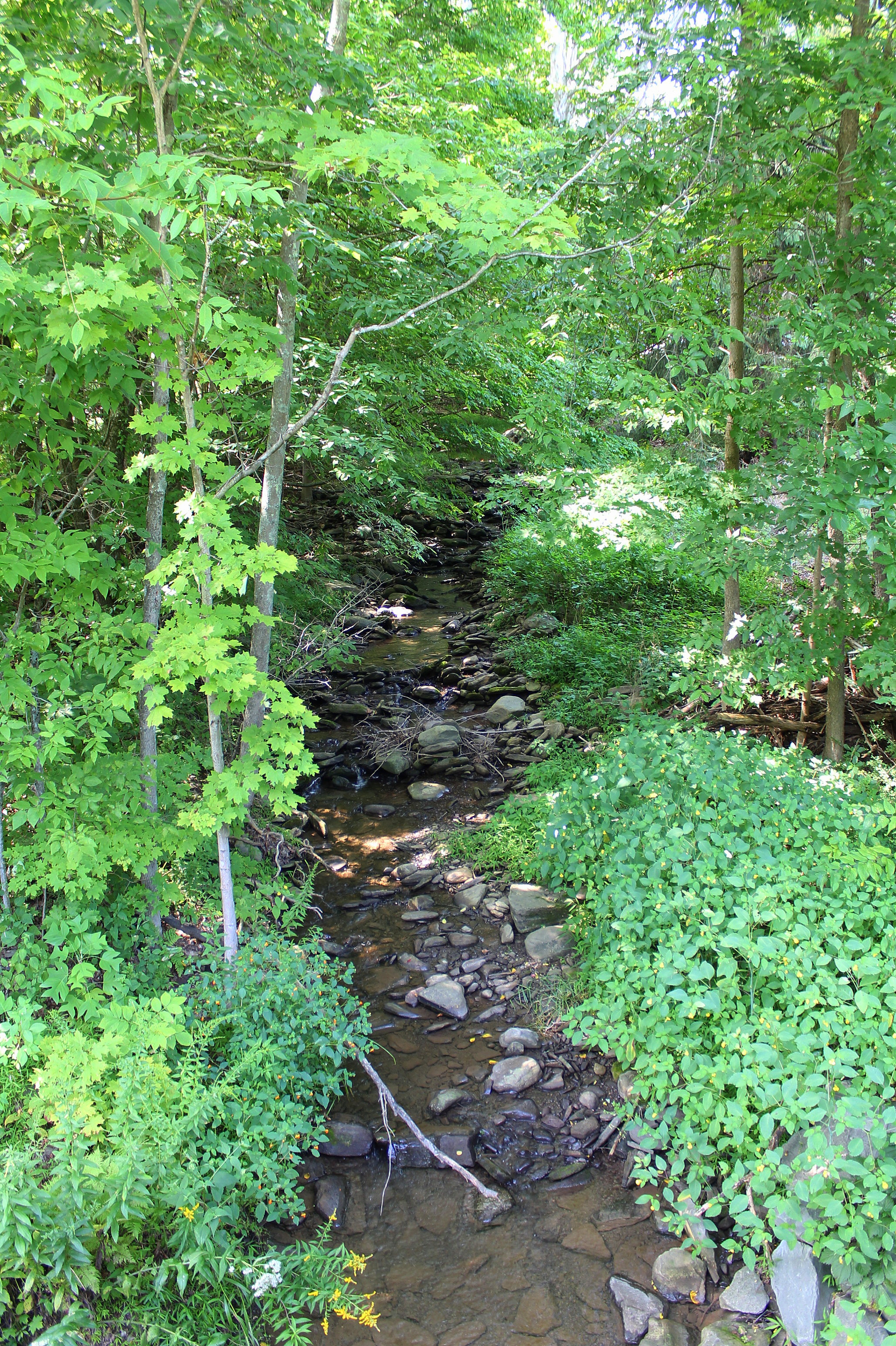
Martin Creek looking downstream

Martin Creek begins in a valley in Northmoreland Township. It flows northeast for a few tenths of a mile before turning east-northeast for several tenths of a mile. The creek then turns north for a short distance, enters Eaton Township, and receives an unnamed tributary from the left before turning east-southeast and reentering Northmoreland Township. Several tenths of a mile further downstream, it reaches its confluence with the Susquehanna River.

Martin Creek joins the Susquehanna River 211.26 miles (339.99 km) upriver of its mouth.

=== Tributaries ===
Martin Creek has no named tributaries. However, it does have an unnamed tributary.

== Hydrology ==
Martin Creek is not designated as an impaired waterbody.

== Geography and geology ==
The elevation near the mouth of Martin Creek is 558 feet (170 m) above sea level. The elevation of the creek's source is between 1,040 and 1,060 feet (317 and 323 m) above sea level.

The surficial geology along most of the length of Martin Creek features Wisconsinan Till. However, patches of alluvium and Wisconsinan Ice-Contact Stratified Drift occur in the creek's vicinity as well. There is also Wisconsinan Outwash near its mouth.

== Watershed ==
The watershed of Martin Creek has an area of 2.25 square miles (5.8 km^{2}). The creek is entirely within the United States Geological Survey quadrangle of Center Moreland. The community of Keelersburg is located near its mouth.

The designated use for Martin Creek is aquatic life.

Williams Field Services has applied for a permit to operate and maintain a gathering pipeline for natural gas in the watershed of Martin Creek. Such a pipeline would have a diameter of 24 inches (61 cm) and crosses an unnamed tributary of the creek.

== History ==
Martin Creek was entered into the Geographic Names Information System on August 2, 1979. Its identifier in the Geographic Names Information System is 1199117.

There is a bridge carrying State Route 2007 (Keelersburg Road) over Martin Creek. In 2012, a permanent bridge repair was approved for the bridge.

== Biology ==
The drainage basin of Martin Creek is designated as a Coldwater fishery and a Migratory Fishery. The Pennsylvania Fish and Boat Commission will hold a meeting in January 2018 to consider adding the entire length of the creek, along with many other streams, to its list of wild trout streams.

== See also ==
- Fitch Creek, next tributary of the Susquehanna River going downriver
- Moneypenny Creek, next tributary of the Susquehanna River going upriver
- List of rivers of Pennsylvania
