= Thurston Hollow =

Thurston Hollow Thurston Hollow Creek
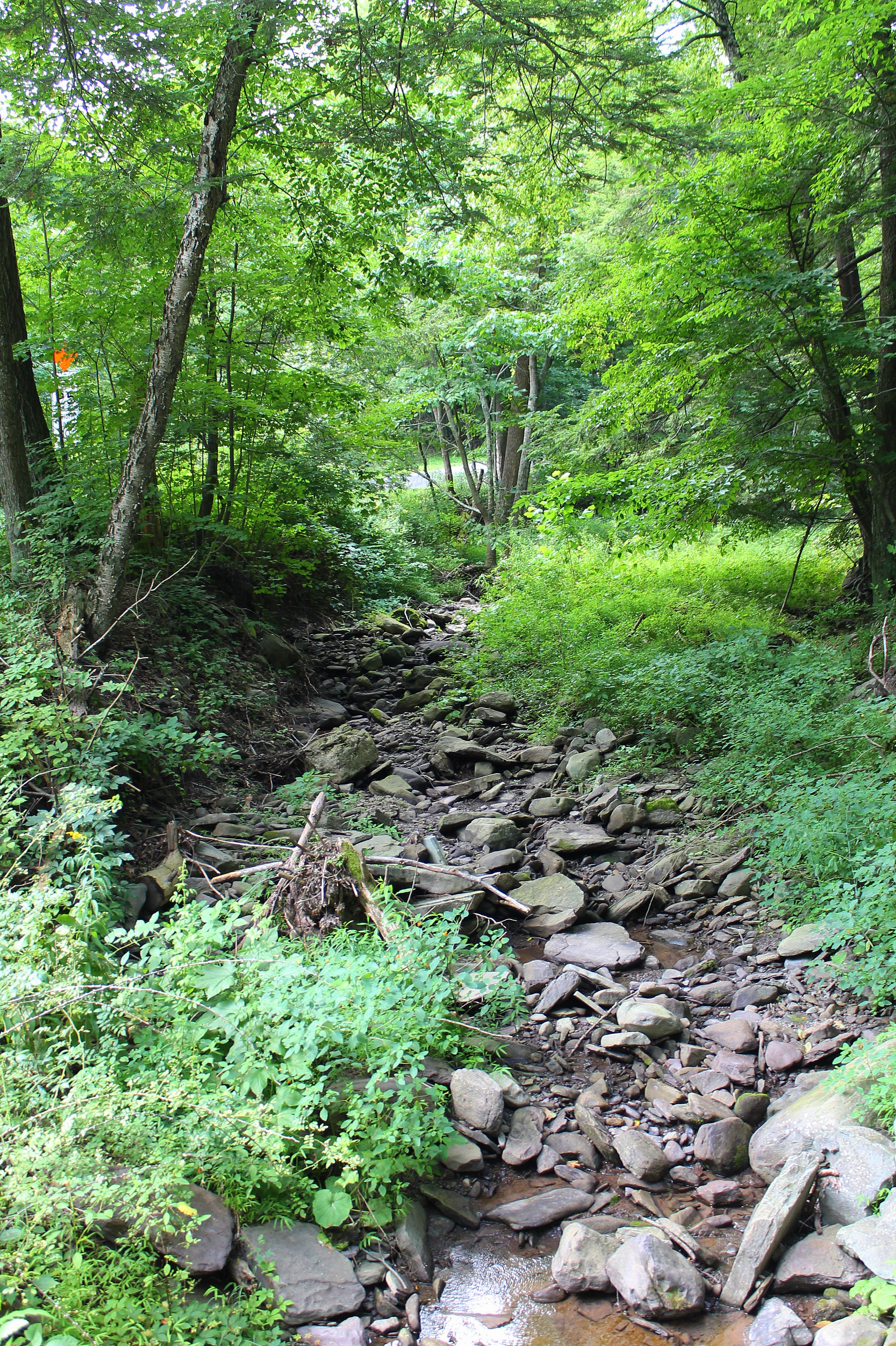
- Thurston Hollow looking upstream

Physical characteristics
- Source
  - location: slopes of a ridge in Eaton Township, Wyoming County, Pennsylvania
  - elevation: between 1,180 and 1,200 feet (360 and 366 m)
- Mouth
  - location: Moneypenny Creek in Eaton Township, Wyoming County, Pennsylvania
  - coordinates: 41°28′39″N 75°55′23″W
  - elevation: 869 ft (265 m)
- Length: 1.4 mi (2.3 km)

Basin features
- Progression: Moneypenny Creek → Susquehanna River → Chesapeake Bay
- Tributaries
  - left: one unnamed tributary

Thurston Hollow (also known as Thurston Hollow Creek) is a tributary of Moneypenny Creek in Wyoming County, Pennsylvania, in the United States. It is approximately 1.4 miles (2.3 km) long and flows through Eaton Township. The stream's watershed has an area of 1.62 square miles (4.2 km^{2}). Thurston Hollow is not designated as an impaired waterbody. The surficial geology in its vicinity consists of Wisconsinan Till, alluvium, and bedrock. It has one unnamed tributary.

== Course ==
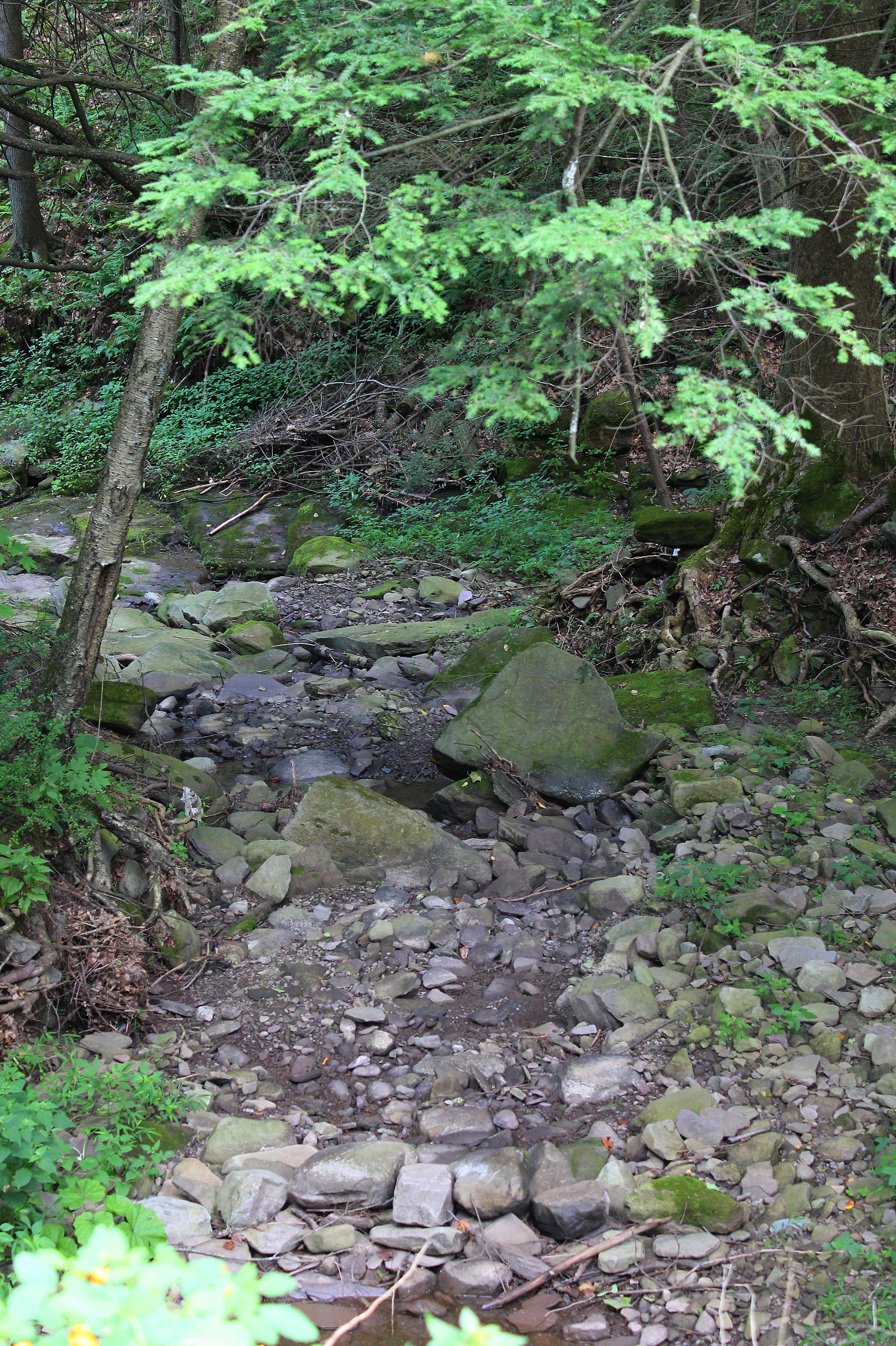
Thurston Hollow looking downstream

Thurston Hollow begins on the slopes of a ridge in Eaton Township. It flows north-northeast for several tenths of a mile, passing through a pond, receiving an unnamed tributary from the left, and enters a valley. The stream then turns nearly due north for several tenths of a mile and passes through another pond before turning east-northeast. Several hundred feet further downstream, it reaches its confluence with Moneypenny Creek.

Thurston Hollow joins Moneypenny Creek 0.95 miles (1.53 km) upstream of its mouth.

== Hydrology ==
Thurston Hollow is not designated as an impaired waterbody.

== Geography and geology ==
The elevation near the mouth of Thurston Hollow is 869 feet (265 m) above sea level. The elevation of the stream's source is between 1,180 and 1,200 feet (360 and 366 m) above sea level.

The surficial geology along the lower reaches of Thurston Hollow mainly consists of alluvium. To the east, the surficial geology consists of bedrock and some Wisconsinan Till. To the west, the surficial geology consists entirely of Wisconsinan Till.

== Watershed ==
The watershed of Thurston Hollow has an area of 1.62 square miles (4.2 km^{2}). The stream is entirely within the United States Geological Survey quadrangle of Center Moreland. Its designated use is for aquatic life.

UGI Energy Services, Inc. once applied for a permit to construct, operate, and maintain the Auburn Line Extension Project, a pipeline with a length of 27.4 miles (44.1 km). Such a project would some stream reaches along at least one unnamed tributary to Thurston Hollow.

== History ==
Thurston Hollow does not have a name of its own, but takes its name from the valley through which it flows. The valley of Thurston Hollow was entered into the Geographic Names Information System on August 2, 1979. Its identifier in the Geographic Names Information System is 1199681.

Thurston Hollow is also known as Thurston Hollow Creek.

Farming has been done in the vicinity of Thurston Hollow.

== See also ==
- List of rivers of Pennsylvania
