= Moneypenny Creek =

River in Pennsylvania, United States

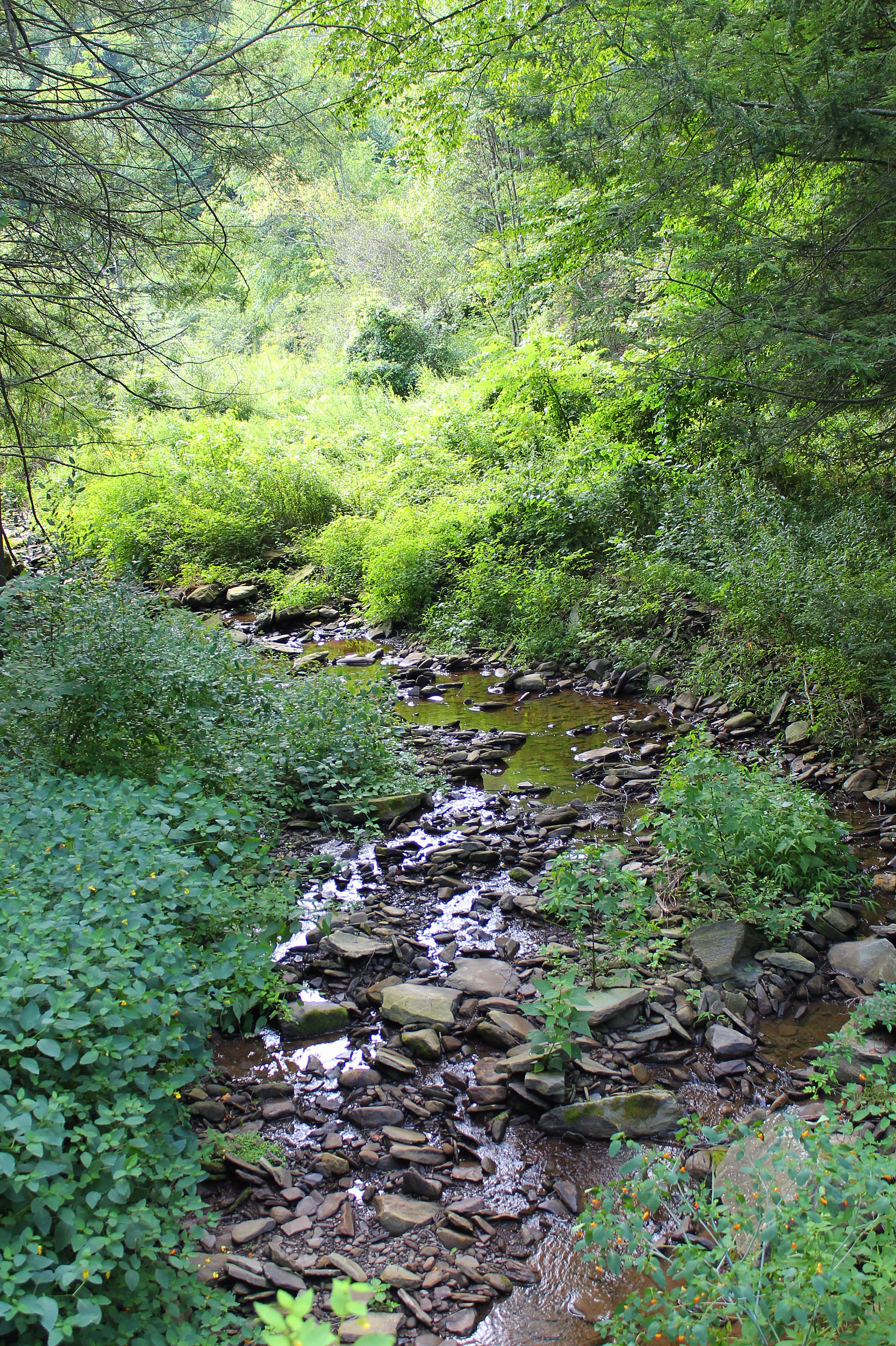
- Moneypenny Creek looking downstream

Physical characteristics
- Source
  - location: Miller Mountain in Eaton Township, Wyoming County, Pennsylvania
  - elevation: between 1,280 and 1,300 feet (390 and 396 m)
- Mouth
  - location: Susquehanna River in Eaton Township, Wyoming County, Pennsylvania
  - coordinates: 41°28′53″N 75°54′26″W
  - elevation: 564 ft (172 m)
- Length: 2.2 mi (3.5 km)
- Basin size: 3.64 mi^{2} (9.4 km^{2})

Basin features
- Progression: Susquehanna River → Chesapeake Bay
- Tributaries
  - right: Thurston Hollow

Moneypenny Creek is a tributary of the Susquehanna River in Wyoming County, Pennsylvania, in the United States. It is approximately 2.2 miles (3.5 km) long and flows through Eaton Township. The creek's watershed has an area of 3.24 square miles (8.4 km^{2}). The creek has one named tributary, which is known as Thurston Hollow. Moneypenny Creek has experienced flash flooding. The surficial geology in its vicinity consists of Wisconsinan Till, bedrock, alluvium, and Wisconsinan Ice-Contact Stratified Drift. The creek's watershed is a Coldwater Fishery and a Migratory Fishery.

== Course ==
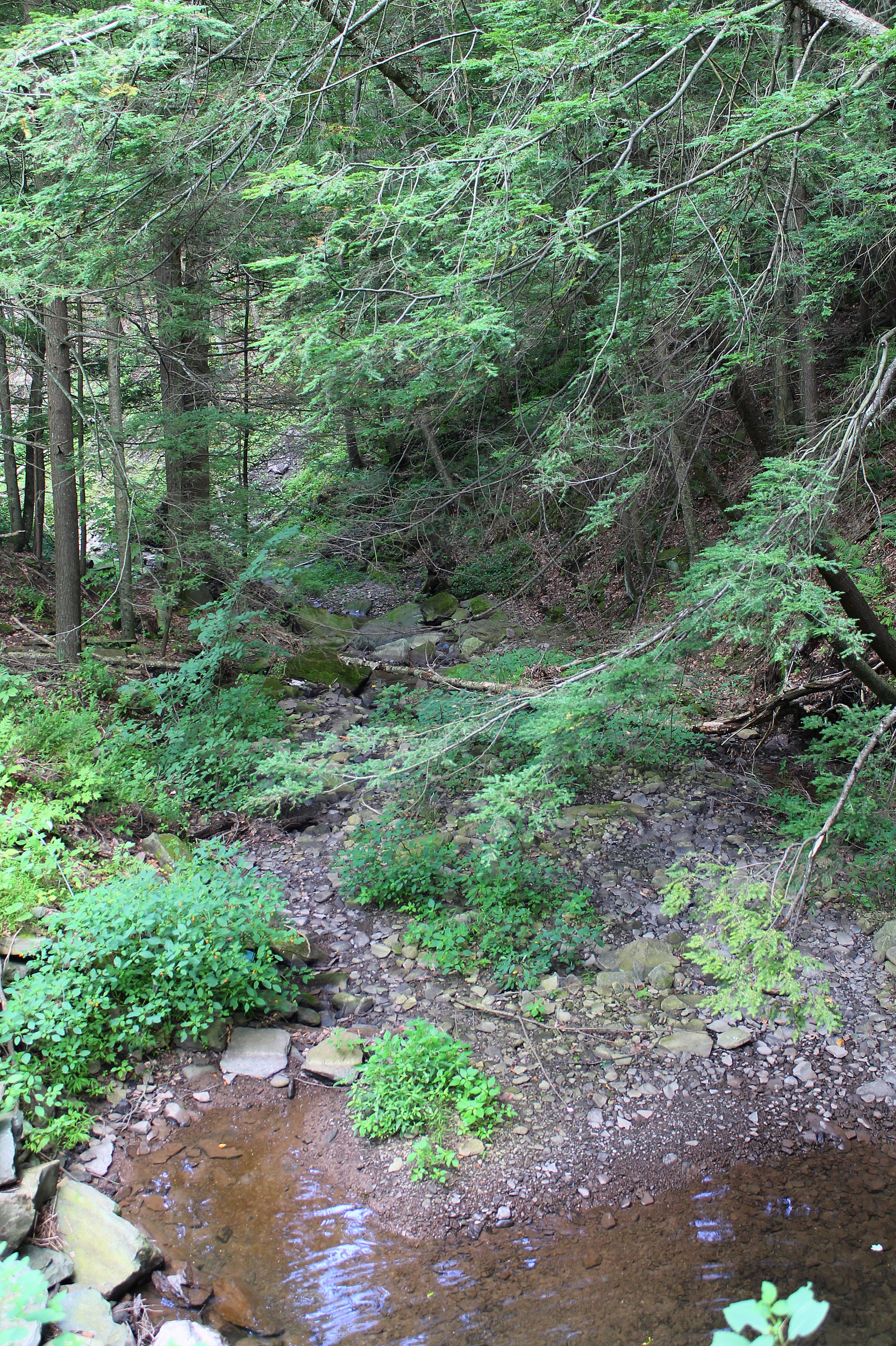
Moneypenny Creek looking upstream

Moneypenny Creek begins on Miller Mountain in Eaton Township, Wyoming County. It flows east for a few tenths of a mile before turning southeast and flowing through a valley. After several tenths of a mile, the creek turns northeast and receives the tributary Thurston Hollow from the right. It then turns east for several tenths of a mile and its valley becomes shallower before it reaches its confluence with the Susquehanna River.

Moneypenny Creek joins the Susquehanna River 213.18 miles (343.08 km) upriver of its mouth.

=== Tributaries ===
Moneypenny Creek has one named tributary, which is known as Thurston Hollow. Thurston Hollow joins Moneypenny Creek 0.95 miles (1.53 km) upstream of its mouth and its watershed has an area of 1.62 square miles (4.2 km^{2}).

== Geography and geology ==
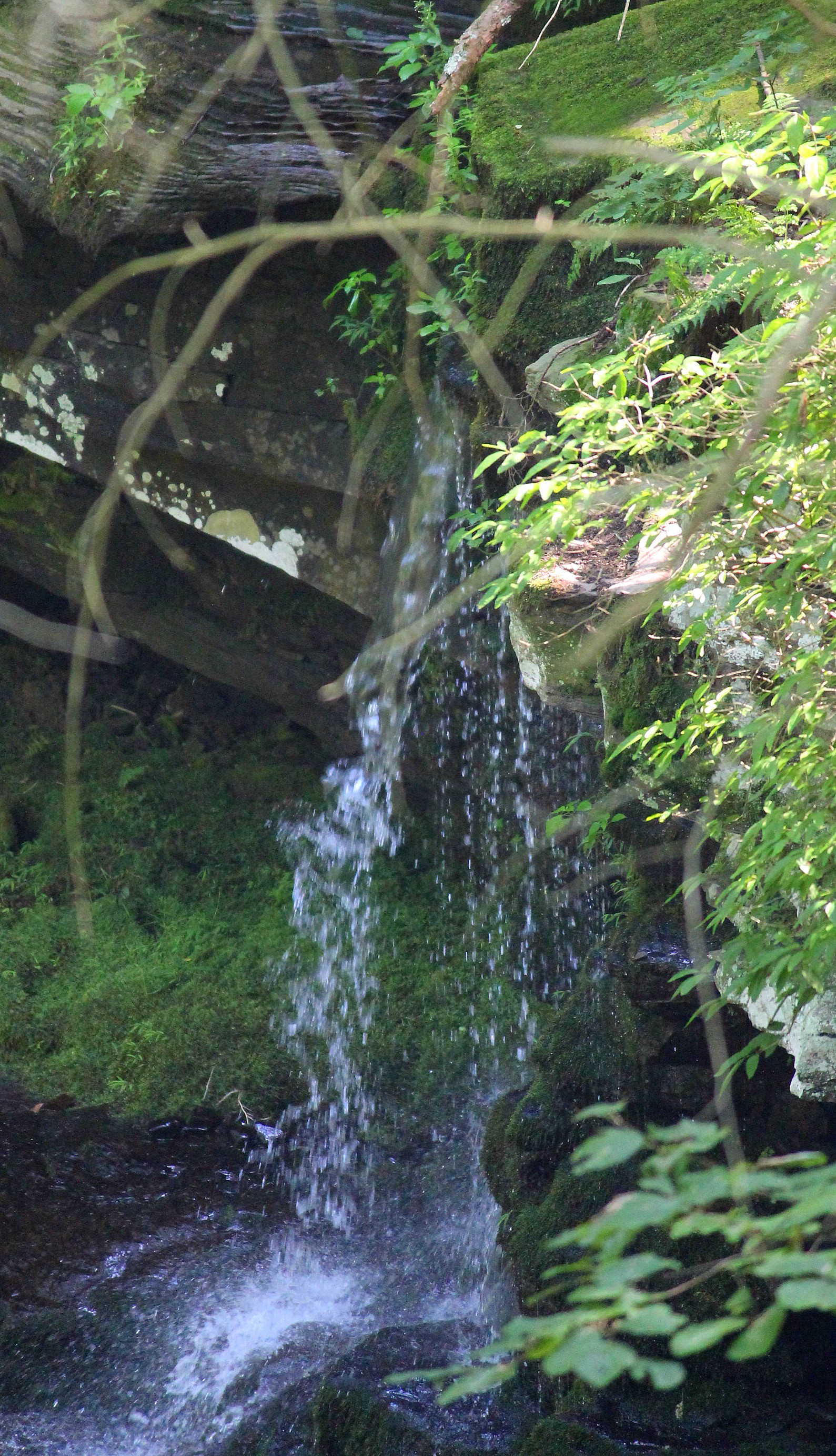
Part of Moneypenny Falls

The elevation near the mouth of Moneypenny Creek is 564 feet (172 m) above sea level. The elevation of the creek's source is between 1,280 and 1,300 feet (390 and 396 m).

The surficial geology along the lowest reaches of Moneypenny Creek mainly consists of alluvium, although Wisconsinan Ice-Contact Stratified Drift, Wisconsinan Till, and bedrock occur nearby. Slightly further upstream, the surficial geology mainly consists of alluvium and bedrock. In the upper reaches of the creek, the surficial geology is almost entirely Wisconsinan Till, but there is some bedrock.

A channel restoration project for a reach of Moneypenny Creek has been proposed.

== Watershed ==
The watershed of Moneypenny Creek has an area of 3.24 square miles (8.4 km^{2}). The creek is entirely within the United States Geological Survey quadrangle of Center Moreland.

UGI Energy Services, Inc. once applied for a permit to construct, operate, and maintain the Auburn Line Extension Project, a pipeline with a length of 27.4 miles (44.1 km). Such a project would impact 86 feet (26 m) of Moneypenny Creek, as well as some of its tributaries.

== History ==
Moneypenny Creek was entered into the Geographic Names Information System on August 2, 1979. Its identifier in the Geographic Names Information System is 1199179.

On May 12, 2004, a virtually stationary thunderstorm appeared over Miller Mountain and Shaver Mountain, causing serious flash flooding on Moneypenny Creek. A total of 6 inches (150 mm) of rain fell, sometimes at over 4 inches (100 mm) per hour and damage costs reached $500,000. A warning issued by National Weather Service Binghamton, New York approximately one hour before the storm specifically mentioned that areas near Moneypenny Creek (and several other areas) were at risk.

A bridge over Moneypenny Creek in Eaton Township is eligible for replacement, as of 2014.

== Biology ==
The drainage basin of Moneypenny Creek is designated as a Coldwater Fishery and a Migratory Fishery.

== See also ==
- Martin Creek (Susquehanna River), next tributary of the Susquehanna River going downriver
- Mill Run (Susquehanna River), next tributary of the Susquehanna River going downriver
- List of rivers of Pennsylvania
