= Mill Creek (Whitelock Creek tributary) =

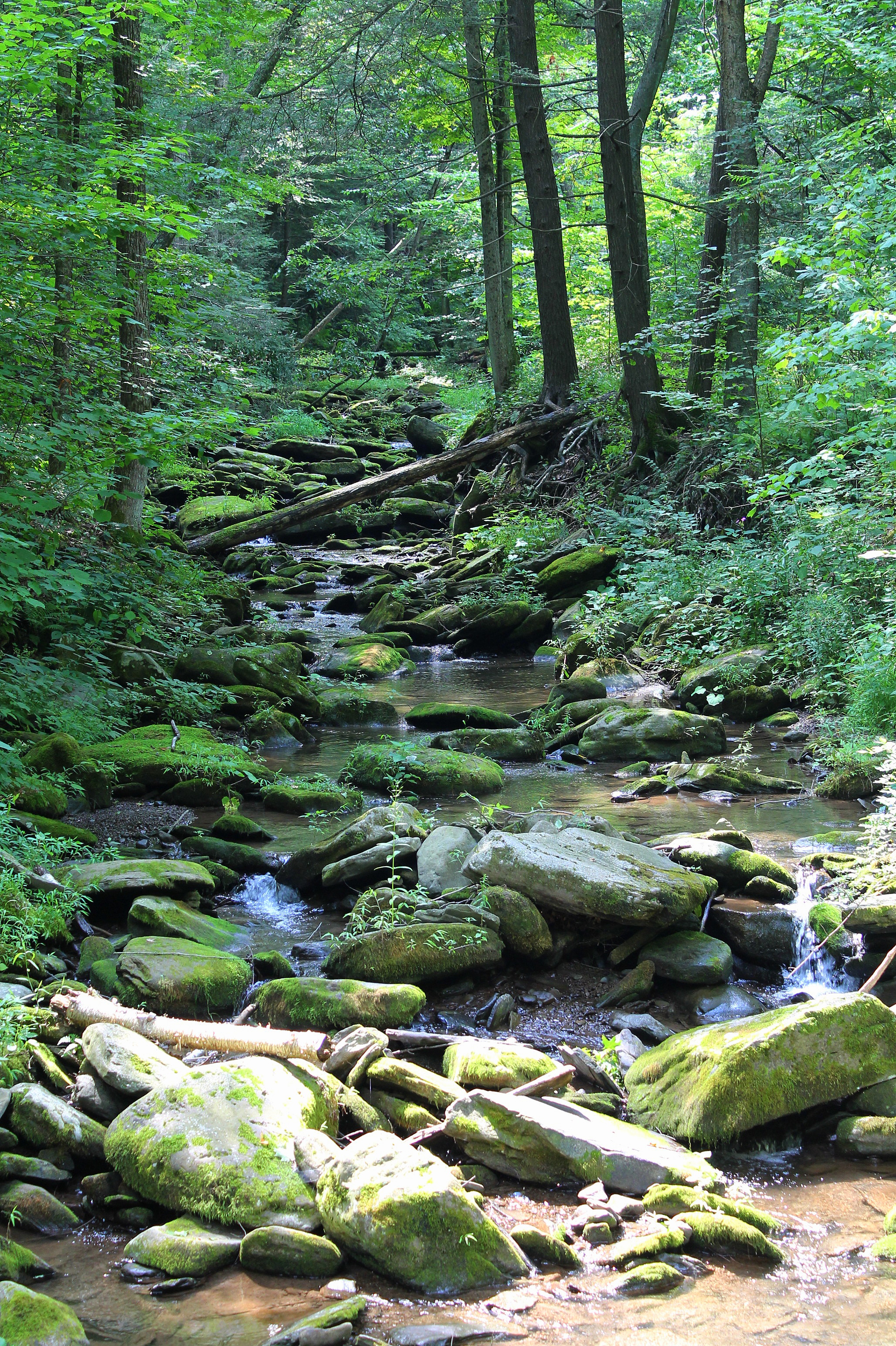
- Mill Creek looking upstream

Physical characteristics
- Source
  - location: unnamed lake in Northmoreland Township, Pennsylvania
  - elevation: between 1,120 and 1,140 feet (341 and 347 m)
- Mouth
  - location: Susquehanna River in Exeter Township, Wyoming County, Pennsylvania
  - coordinates: 41°26′26″N 75°51′34″W
  - elevation: 577 ft (176 m)
- Length: 4.7 mi (7.6 km)
- Basin size: 3.77 sq mi (9.8 km^{2})

Basin features
- Progression: Whitelock Creek → Susquehanna River → Chesapeake Bay

Mill Creek is a tributary of Whitelock Creek in Wyoming County, Pennsylvania, in the United States. It is approximately 4.7 miles (7.6 km) long and flows through Northmoreland Township and Exeter Township. The watershed of the creek has an area of 3.77 square miles (9.8 km^{2}). The surficial geology in its vicinity consists mainly of alluvium, Wisconsinan Till, bedrock, Wisconsinan Ice-Contact Stratified Drift, and loess.

== Course ==
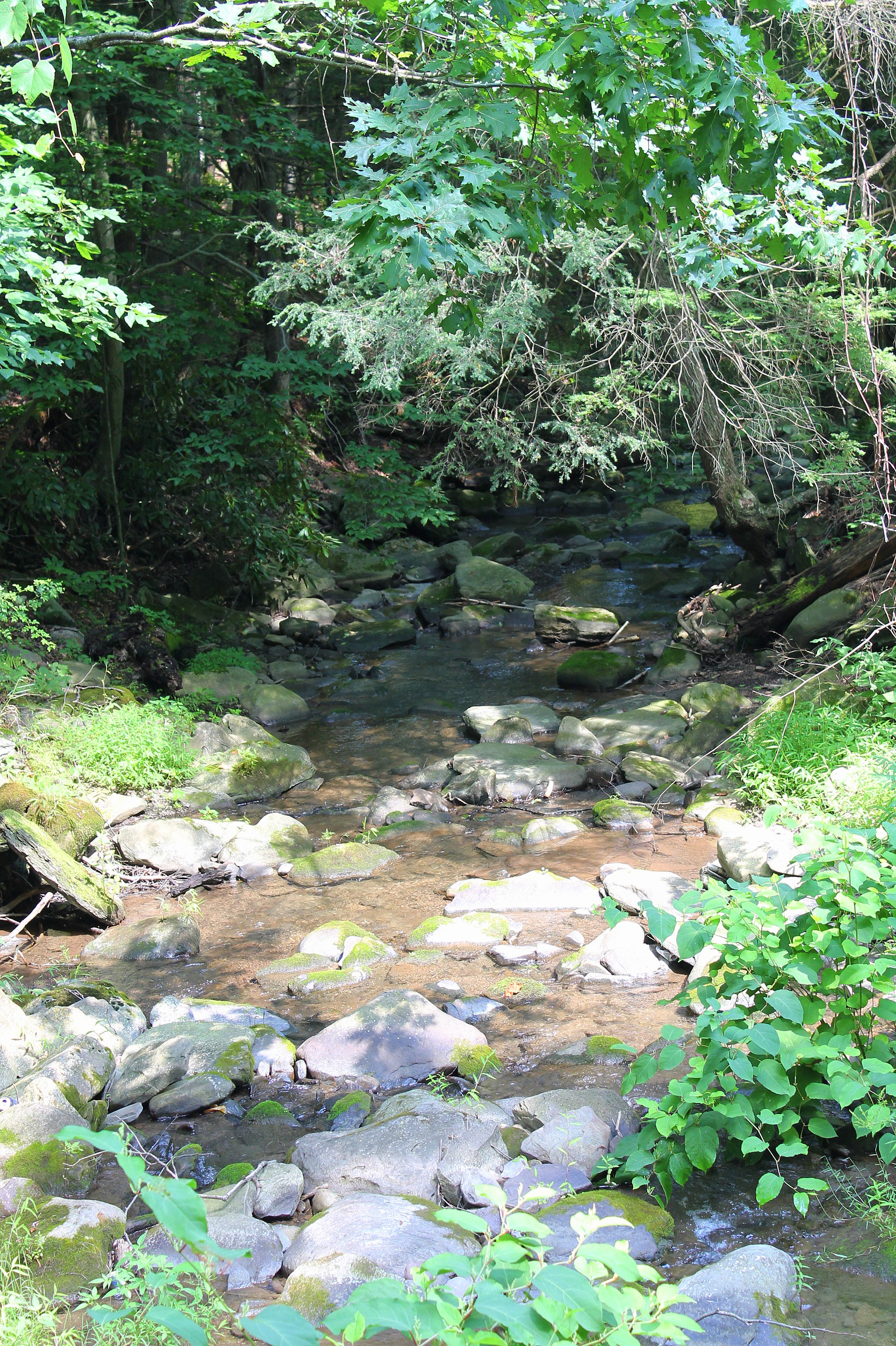
Mill Creek looking downstream

Mill Creek begins in an unnamed lake in Northmoreland Township. It flows east-southeast for a short distance before turning east-northeast and flowing into a valley. After several tenths of a mile, the creek turns east for several tenths of a mile before turning northeast for several tenths of a mile and passing through a pond or small lake. It then turns southeast for several tenths of a mile before turning east for a short distance and then turning northeast. A few tenths of a mile further downstream, the creek turns northeast for a short distance before gradually turning east and then south. After several tenths of a mile, it crosses Pennsylvania Route 292 and reaches its confluence with Whitelock Creek.

Mill Creek joins Whitelock Creek 0.28 miles (0.45 km) upstream of its mouth.

== Geography and geology ==
The elevation near the mouth of Mill Creek is 577 feet (176 m) above sea level. The elevation of the creek's source is between 1,120 and 1,140 feet (341 and 347 m) above sea level.

The surficial geology near the mouth of Mill Creek mainly consists of alluvium and Wisconsinan Ice-Contact Stratified Drift. However, slightly further upstream, Wisconsinan Till dominates. Alluvium again occurs along the creek in its middle and upper reaches, although larger Wisconsinan Till and bedrock consisting of sandstone and shale occur nearby. There are also a few patches of loess, which contains silt and fine sand.

There is a pipeline in the watershed of Mill Creek. In 2013, this pipeline was found to violate the Clean Streams Law. Mill Creek has been one of the receiving streams for Williams Field Services Company, LLC's erosion and sediment control permit.

== Watershed ==
The watershed of Mill Creek has an area of 3.77 square miles (9.8 km^{2}). The mouth of the creek is in the United States Geological Survey quadrangle of Ransom. However, its source is in the quadrangle of Center Moreland.

== History ==
Mill Creek was entered into the Geographic Names Information System on August 2, 1979. Its identifier in the Geographic Names Information System is 1199158.

A concrete stringer/multi-beam or girder bridge carrying State Route 2002 was built over Mill Creek in 1930. It is 24.9 feet (7.6 m) long and is in Exeter Township.

== Biology ==
Wild trout naturally reproduce in Mill Creek from its headwaters downstream to its mouth. The creek is designated as a Coldwater Fishery.

== See also ==
- List of rivers of Pennsylvania
