= Whitelock Creek =

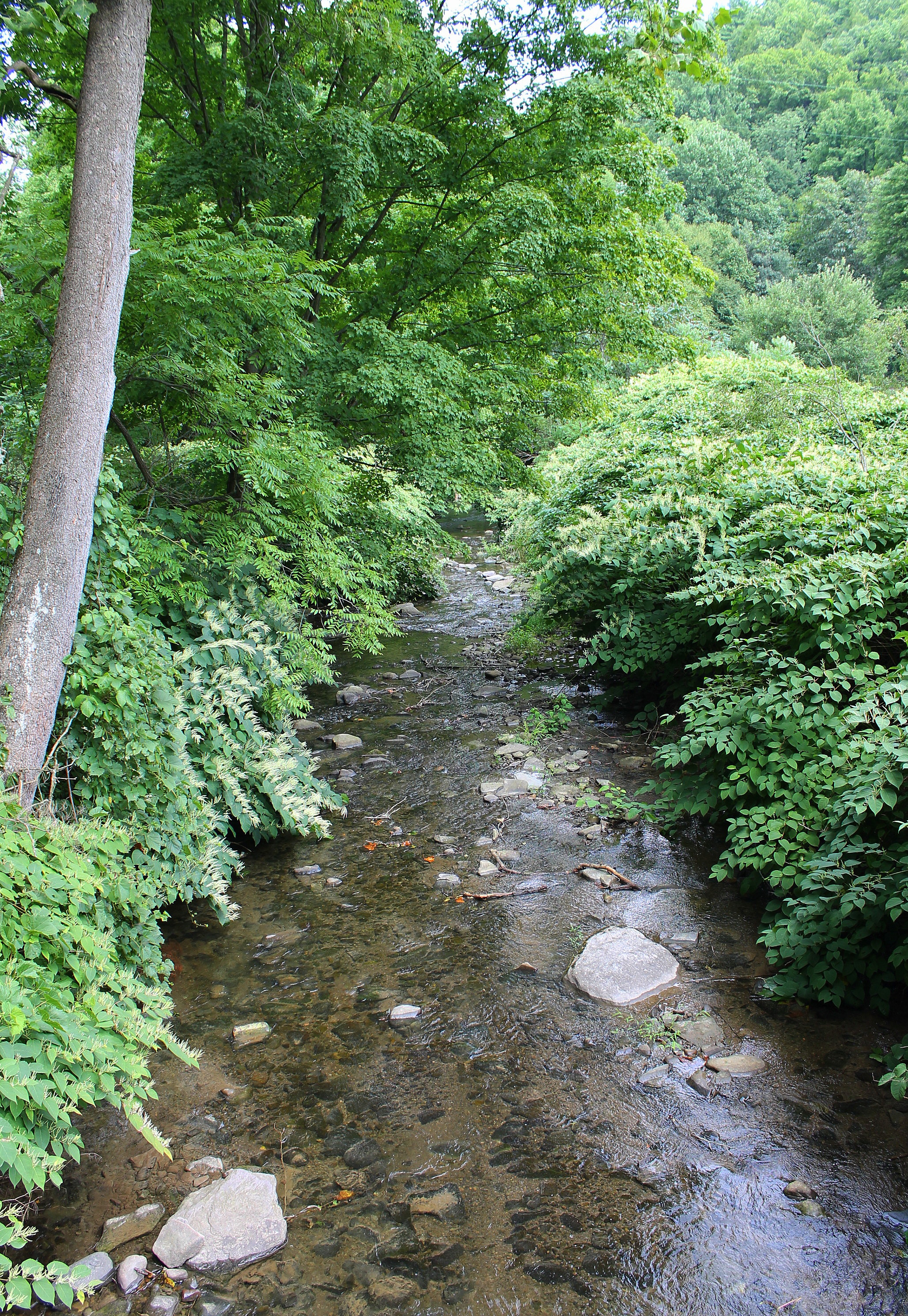
- Whitelock Creek looking downstream

Physical characteristics
- Source
  - location: hill in Northmoreland Township, Wyoming County, Pennsylvania
  - elevation: between 1,340 and 1,360 feet (408 and 415 m)
- Mouth
  - location: Susquehanna River in Exeter Township, Wyoming County, Pennsylvania
  - coordinates: 41°26′30″N 75°51′17″W
  - elevation: 554 ft (169 m)
- Length: 7.6 mi (12.2 km)
- Basin size: 11.6 sq mi (30 km^{2})

Basin features
- Progression: Susquehanna River → Chesapeake Bay
- Tributaries
  - left: Mill Creek

Whitelock Creek is a tributary of the Susquehanna River in Wyoming County and Luzerne County, Pennsylvania. It is approximately 7.6 miles (12.2 km) long and flows through Northmoreland Township and Exeter Township in Wyoming County and Franklin Township and Exeter Township in Luzerne County. The watershed of the creek has an area of 11.6 square miles (30 km^{2}). It has one named tributary, which is known as Mill Creek. The surficial geology in the vicinity of Whitelock Creek mainly consists of alluvium, Wisconsinan Ice-Contact Stratified Drift, Wisconsinan Till, bedrock, and alluvial terrace.

Major land uses in the watershed of Whitelock Creek include forested land and agricultural land. A number of bridges have been constructed over the creek. Its watershed is designated as a Coldwater Fishery and a Migratory Fishery. Trout have been observed in Whitelock Creek, as have numerous macroinvertebrate taxa.

== Course ==
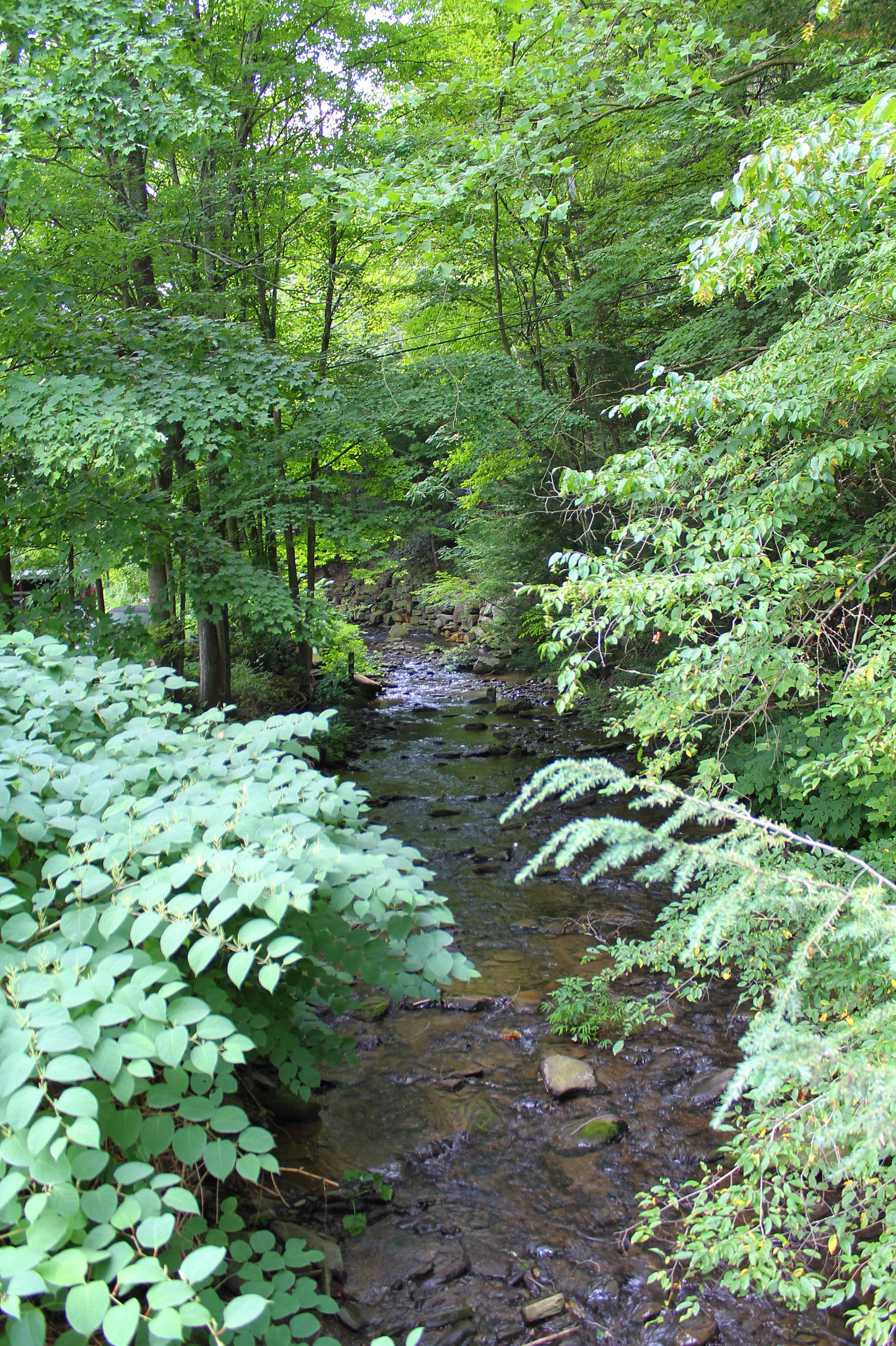
Whitelock Creek looking upstream

Whitelock Creek begins on a hill in Northmoreland Township, Wyoming County. It flows south-southeast for several tenths of a mile before turning east and then southeast. After a few tenths of a mile, the creek enters Franklin Township, Luzerne County and flows into Perrins Marsh. In Perrins Marsh, it reenters Northmoreland Township, Wyoming County and flows north-northeast for a few tenths of amile. It then turns east-northeast for a few miles, flowing along a valley that gradually narrows. The creek enters Exeter Township, Wyoming County and briefly passes into Exeter Township, Luzerne County before reentering Exeter Township, Wyoming County. It then turns north-northeast for a few miles before turning east and receiving Mill Creek, its only named tributary, from the left. The creek continues flowing east along the border of the census-designated place of West Falls before crossing Pennsylvania Route 92 and reaching its confluence with the Susquehanna River.

Whitelock Creek joins the Susquehanna River 207.28 miles (333.58 km) upriver of its mouth.

=== Tributaries ===
Whitelock Creek has one named tributary, which is known as Mill Creek. Mill Creek joins Whitelock Creek 0.28 miles (0.45 km) upstream of its mouth and its watershed has an area of 3.77 square miles (9.8 km^{2}).

== Geography and geology ==
The elevation near the mouth of Whitelock Creek is 554 feet (169 m) above sea level. The elevation of the creek's source is between 1,340 and 1,360 feet (408 and 415 m) above sea level.

The surficial geology along the lower reaches of Whitelock Creek mainly consists of alluvium. The sides of its valley have surficial geology featuring Wisconsinan Ice-Contact Stratified Drift, Wisconsinan Till, and bedrock consisting of coal, conglomeratic sandstone, sandstone, and shale. There is also a patch of alluvial terrace near the creek's mouth. The surficial geology further upstream is fairly similar except that there is little Wisconsinan Ice-Contact Stratified Drift or alluvium at the headwaters and that the bedrock consists only of sandstone and shale.

There are at least 2.0 miles (3.2 km) of pipeline in the watershed of Whitelock Creek. This pipeline crosses a number of streams.

== Watershed ==
The watershed of Whitelock Creek has an area of 11.6 square miles (30 km^{2}). The mouth of the stream is in the United States Geological Survey quadrangle of Ransom. However, its source is in the quadrangle of Center Moreland.

A dam known as Perrins Marsh Dam is situated on Whitelock Creek. The dam is classified as a "significant hazard" dam, as of 1981. At this point in time, a dam failure could have caused damage to properties and bridges further downstream, as well as possibly killing several people.

The main land use in the watershed of Whitelock Creek is forested land. However, agricultural land is also present in significant amounts. In the early 1980s, the land downstream of the Perrins Marsh Dam was mainly rural residential land for approximately 1 mile (1.6 km). Further downstream, it flowed through a largely uninhabited valley.

== History ==
Whitelock Creek was entered into the Geographic Names Information System on August 2, 1979. Its identifier in the Geographic Names Information System is 1199788.

A steel stringer/multi-beam or girder bridge carrying State Route 2011/Village Road was built over Whitelock Creek in 1941 and is 27.9 feet (8.5 m) long. A bridge of the same type was built over the creek in 1945 3 miles (4.8 km) east of Center Moreland. This bridge is 44.9 feet (13.7 m) and carries T348/Lockville Road. A third bridge of the same type was built over the creek in 1945 and was repaired in 1996. It is 33.1 feet (10.1 m) long and carries T336. A concrete slab bridge carrying State Route 2009/Brace Road over Whitelock Creek was constructed in 1961 and is 30.8 feet (9.4 m) long. In 2007, a concrete box beam or girders bridge carrying Pennsylvania Route 92 over the creek was built. This bridge is 62.0 feet (18.9 m) long.

A cleanup of flood debris and gravel on Whitelock Creek was planned in 2006. In 2012, several members of the National Civilian Community Corps cleaned up debris along Whitelock Creek. One bridge over the creek is considered to be structurally deficient.

== Biology ==
The drainage basin of Whitelock Creek is designated as a Coldwater Fishery and a Migratory Fishery. Wild trout naturally reproduce in the creek and its tributary Mill Creek from their upper reaches downstream to their mouths.

Numerous macroinvertebrate taxa have been observed in Whitelock Creek. At one site in the summer of 2012, 162 individuals from 17 taxa were observed at the creek. These included four beetle genera, three dragonfly genera, two caddisfly genera, two mayfly genera, and two stonefly genera. The clam genus Sphaerium, the crayfish genus Orconectes, the hellgrammite genus Corydalus, and the midge family Chironomidae were also observed. The EPT (Ephemeroptera, Plecoptera, and Trichoptera) taxa richness value was 6 and the Becks Index Version 3 value was 8. The Hilsenhoff Biotic Index value was 3.994 and the Shannon Diversity Index value was 1.924.

At another site on Whitelock Creek, 148 individuals from 11 macroinvertebrate taxa were observed in the summer of 2012. These included two caddisfly genera, two dragonfly genera, and two mayfly genera. They also included the beetle genus Optioservus, the cranefly genus Leptotarsus, the hellgrammite genus Corydalus, and the midge family Chironomidae.

== See also ==
- Keeler Creek, next tributary of the Susquehanna River going downriver
- Buttermilk Creek (Susquehanna River), next tributary of the Susquehanna River going upriver
- List of rivers of Pennsylvania
