= Fords Lake =

- Location within Pennsylvania Location within the United States
- Location: Lackawanna County, Pennsylvania
- Coordinates: 41°29′38″N 75°45′48″W
- Basin countries: United States
- Built: 1995
- Surface area: 73 acres (30 ha)
- Surface elevation: 1,142 ft (348 m)

Fords Lake is a man made, 67 acres (27 ha) lake with an average depth of 11 feet (3.4 m) on Buttermilk Creek in Lackawanna County, Pennsylvania constructed in 1995. Owned by the state of Pennsylvania and controlled by the state Fish and Boat Commission, it is used for recreation purposes, such as boating, which is limited to electric powered motors and un-powered boats and for fishing. A surfaced launch ramp and parking facilities are also present upon entrance of the lake.

== See also ==
- List of lakes in Pennsylvania
