= Osterhout Mountain =

Mountain in Pennsylvania, United States

Coordinates: 41.5362°N 75.8986°W

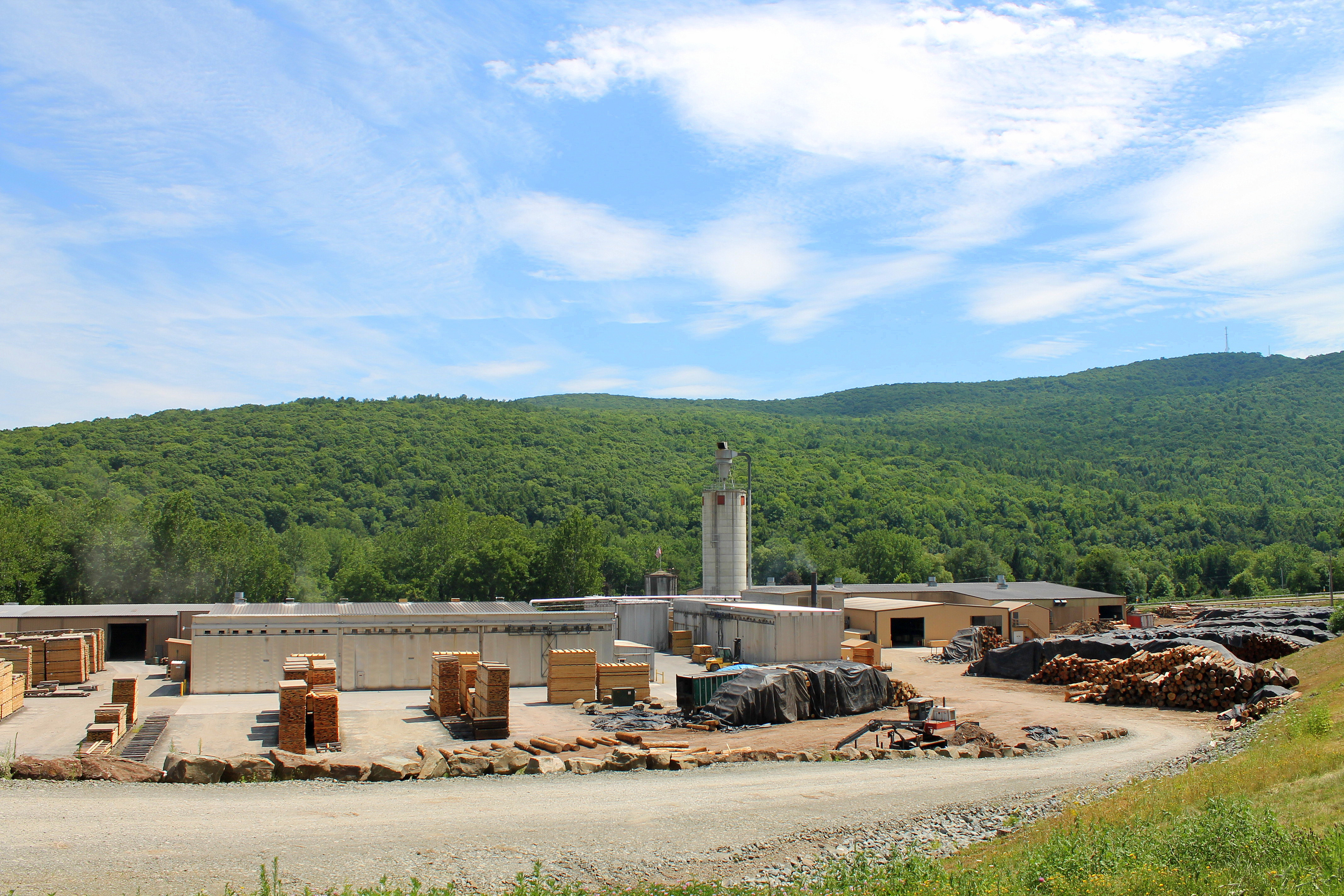
- Osterhout Mountain in May 2016

Highest point
- Elevation: 1,879 ft (573 m)

Geography
- Location: Wyoming County, Pennsylvania, U.S.
- Parent range: Appalachian Mountains
- Topo map(s): USGS Tunkhannock, PA

Osterhout Mountain is a summit located in Wyoming County, Pennsylvania. Osterhout is located on the east bank of the Susquehanna River opposite its sister peak Miller Mountain. The mountain has communication towers on its summit and rises over the town of Tunkhannock Pennsylvania.

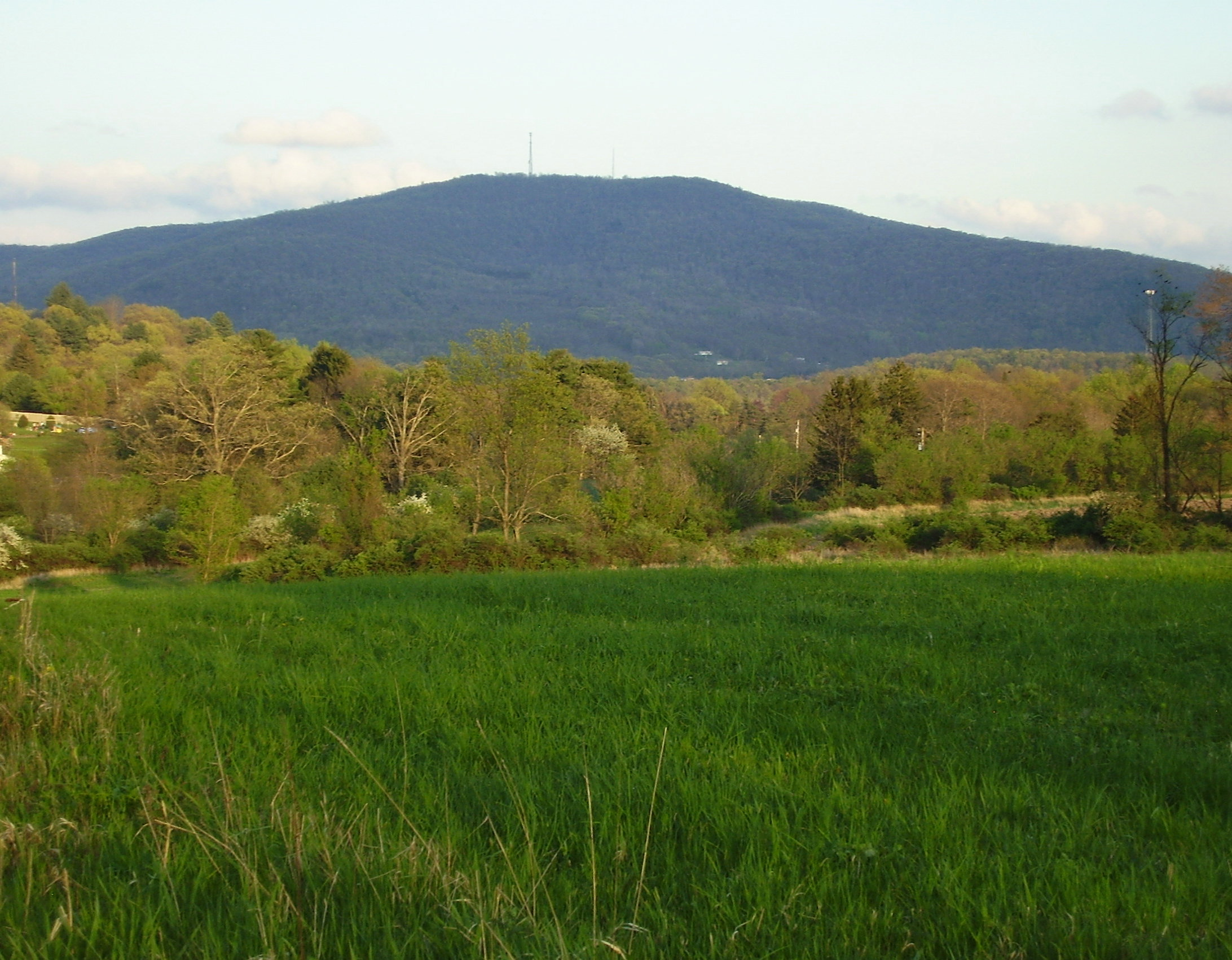
Osterhout Mountain
