= Falls Township, Wyoming County, Pennsylvania =

Township in Pennsylvania, US

Falls Township
- Township
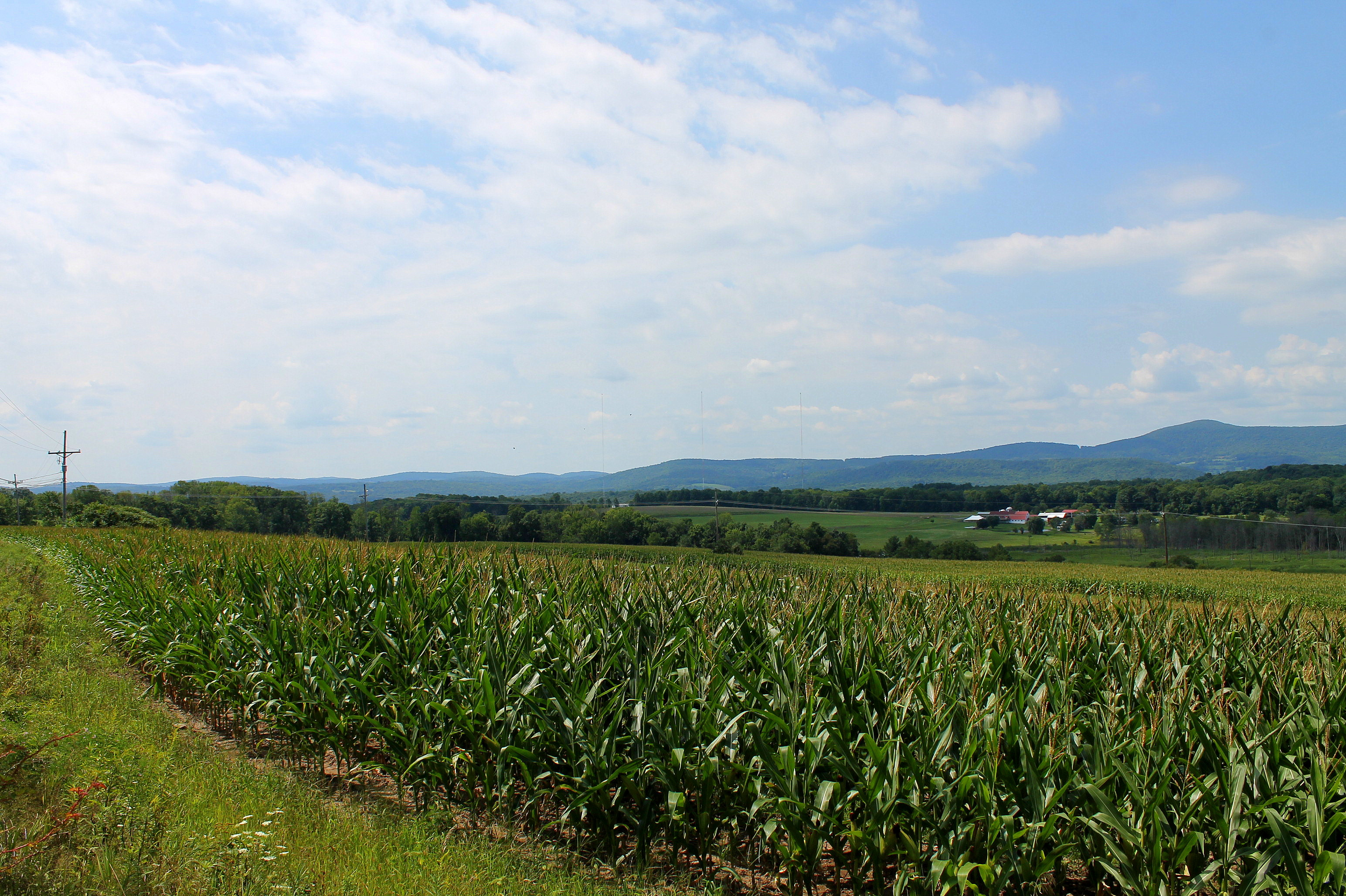
- Scenery of Falls Township from Post Hill

- Location of Pennsylvania in the United States
- Coordinates: 41°30′06″N 75°47′59″W
- Country: United States
- State: Pennsylvania
- County: Wyoming

Area
  - Total: 21.14 sq mi (54.76 km^{2})
  - Land: 20.59 sq mi (53.33 km^{2})
  - Water: 0.55 sq mi (1.42 km^{2})
- Elevation: 1,234 ft (376 m)

Population (2020)
  - Total: 1,690 ▼
  - Estimate (2021): 1,689
  - Density: 94.2/sq mi (36.38/km^{2})
- Time zone: UTC-5 (EST)
  - Summer (DST): UTC-4 (EDT)
- ZIP Code: 18615
- Area code: 570
- FIPS code: 42-131-25128
- Website: https://www.fallspa.gov/

Falls Township is a township in Wyoming County, Pennsylvania, United States. The population was 1,690 at the 2020 census.

== Geography ==
According to the United States Census Bureau, the township has a total area of 21.15 square miles (54.8 km^{2}), of which 20.6 square miles (53 km^{2}) is land and 0.55 square miles (1.4 km^{2}) (2.6%) is water.

== Demographics ==
Historical population
Census	Pop.	Note	%±
2010	1,995		—
2020	1,690		−15.3%
2021 (est.)	1,689		−0.1%
U.S. Decennial Census

As of the census of 2010, there were 1,995 people, 771 households, and 560 families residing in the township. The population density was 96.8 inhabitants per square mile (37.4/km^{2}). There were 824 housing units at an average density of 40/sq mi (15.6/km^{2}). The racial makeup of the township was 97.5% White, 1.1% African American, 0.1% Native American, 0.1% Asian, 0.1% Pacific Islander, 0.5% from other races, and 0.6% from two or more races. Hispanic or Latino of any race were 1.3% of the population.

There were 771 households, out of which 30.1% had children under the age of 18 living with them, 57.5% were married couples living together, 9.3% had a female householder with no husband present, and 27.4% were non-families. 23.1% of all households were made up of individuals, and 11% had someone living alone who was 65 years of age or older. The average household size was 2.52 and the average family size was 2.97.

In the township the population was spread out, with 24.4% under the age of 18, 59.3% from 18 to 64, and 16.3% who were 65 years of age or older. The median age was 43 years.

The median income for a household in the township was $51,019, and the median income for a family was $57,788. Males had a median income of $41,118 versus $30,625 for females. The per capita income for the township was $21,217. About 9.6% of families and 13% of the population were below the poverty line, including 31.2% of those under age 18 and 2.6% of those age 65 or over.
