= Pennsylvania Route 292 =

State highway in Pennsylvania, US

Pennsylvania Route 292

Route information
- Maintained by PennDOT
- Length: 11.483 mi (18.480 km)

Major junctions
- West end: PA 29 near Evans Falls
- East end: PA 92 in Exeter Township

Location
- Country: United States
- State: Pennsylvania
- Counties: Wyoming

Highway system
- Pennsylvania State Route System; Interstate; US; State; Scenic; Legislative
← PA 291	→ PA 293

Pennsylvania Route 292 (PA 292) is an 11.5-mile-long (18.5 km) state highway located in Wyoming County, Pennsylvania. The western terminus is at PA 29 near Evans Falls. The eastern terminus is at PA 92 in Exeter Township. The route is a two-lane undivided road that passes through rural areas in the southern part of Wyoming County, serving the communities of Vernon and Center Moreland. PA 292 was designated in 1928 between PA 92 (now PA 29) and U.S. Route 309 (US 309, now PA 92), with the route east of Center Moreland following Creamery Road, Schoolhouse Road, and Keelersburg Road. The route was moved to its current alignment east of Center Moreland by 1930 and the entire route was paved in the 1930s.

== Route description ==
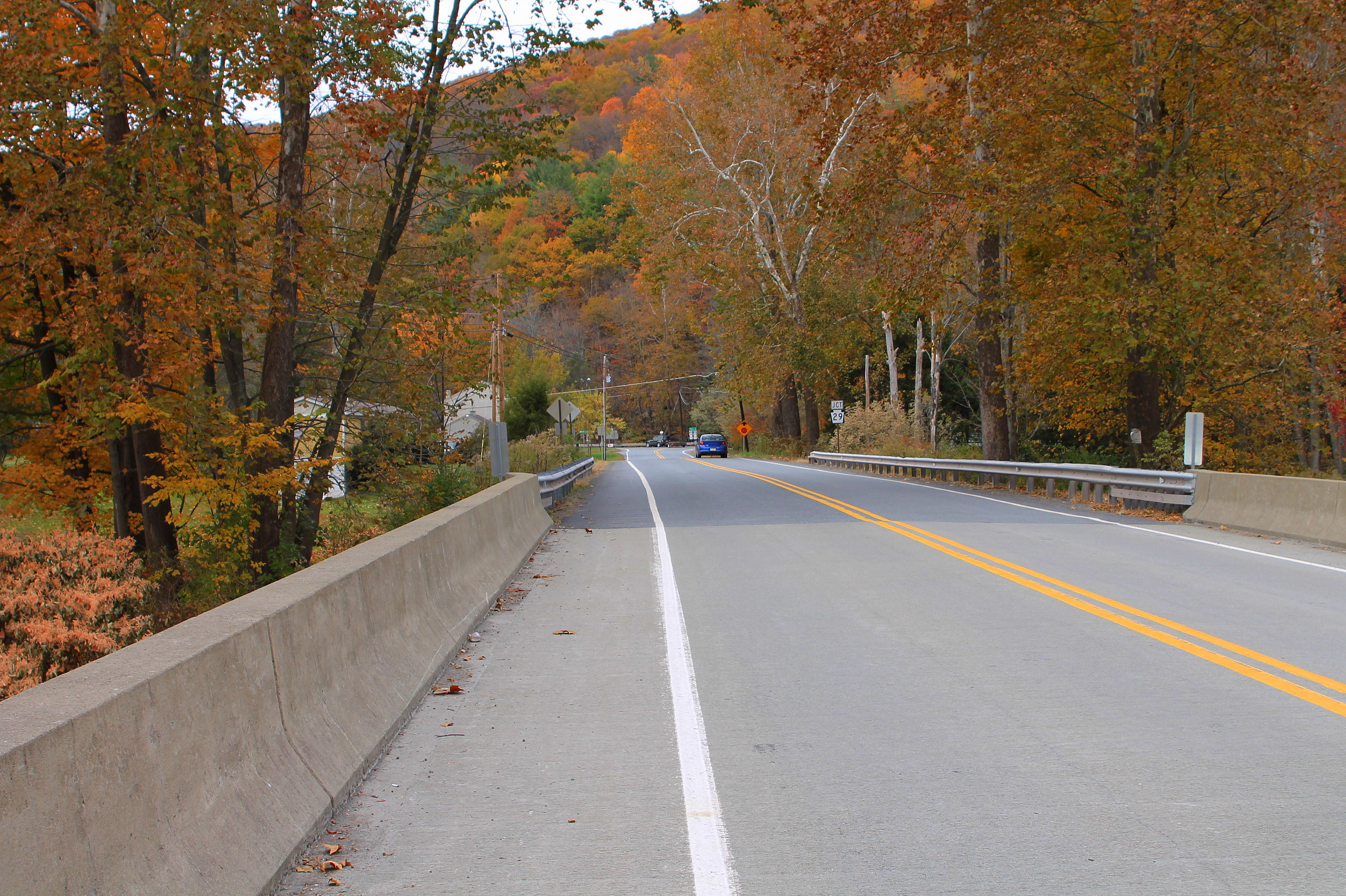
PA 292 near its western terminus at PA 29 near Evans Falls

PA 292 begins at an intersection with PA 29 in Eaton Township, heading east on a two-lane undivided road. The route immediately enters Monroe Township as it heads through wooded areas with some homes, crossing Bowman Creek. PA 292 turns south and runs through woodland with some fields and residences, curving to the east. The road briefly heads through Eaton Township again before continuing southeast into Northmoreland Township. The route runs through more farmland and woodland with some homes, turning south at Vernon before resuming southeast. PA 292 continues through rural areas, turning east at Center Moreland. The road passes through Finchs Corners and enters Exeter Township, heading into forested areas with some homes and turning north-northeast. PA 292 comes to its eastern terminus at an intersection with PA 92.

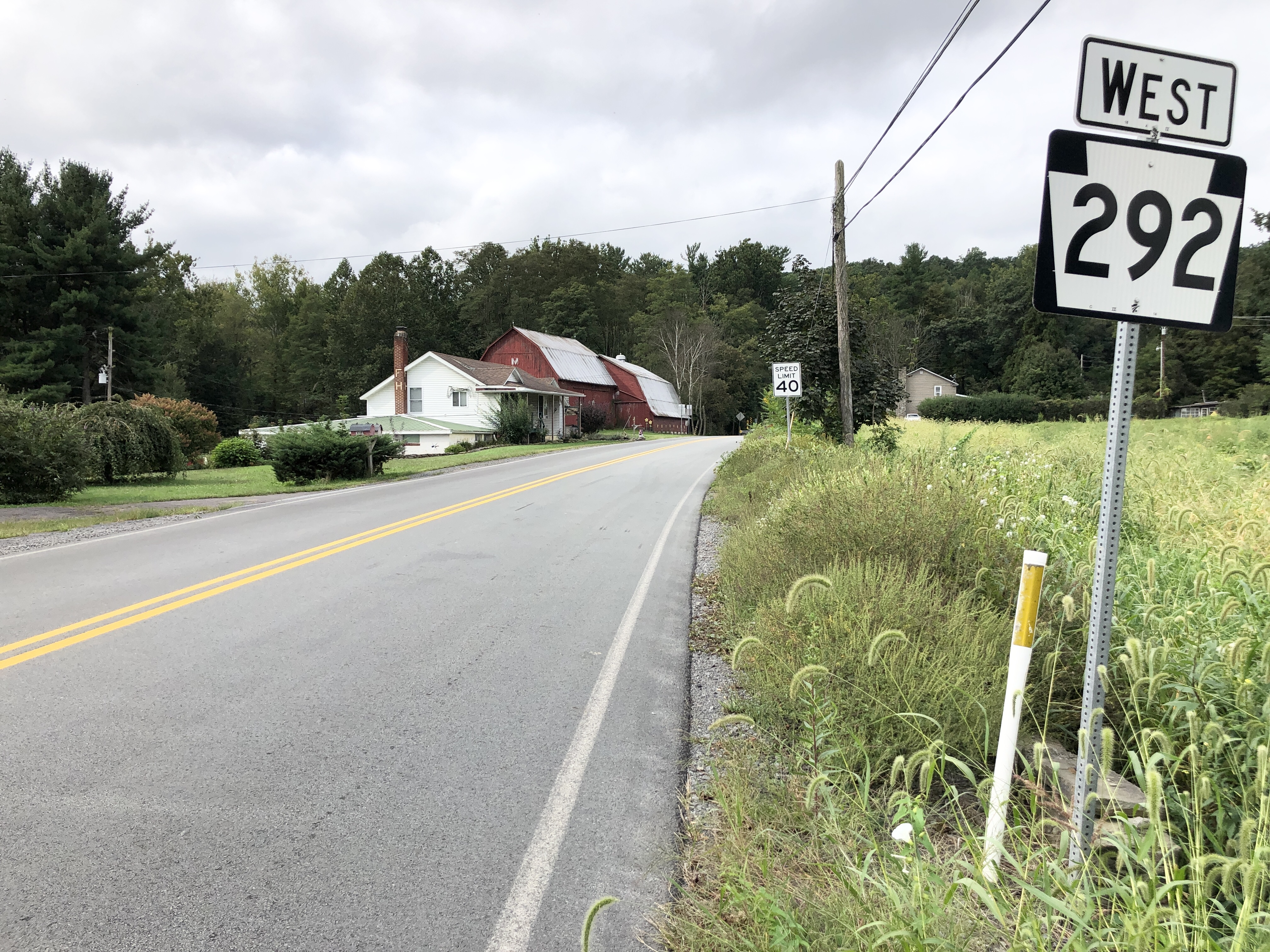
PA 292 westbound at its eastern terminus at PA 92 in Exeter Township

== History ==
When Pennsylvania first legislated routes in 1911, what is now PA 292 was not given a number. PA 292 was designated in 1928 to run from PA 92 (now PA 29) east to US 309 (now PA 92) in southern Wyoming County, following its current alignment east to Center Moreland before following Creamery Road, Schoolhouse Road, and Keelersburg Road east to US 309. At this time, the entire length of the route was unpaved. By 1930, PA 292 was shifted to ts current alignment between Center Moreland and US 309, which was unpaved. The entire length of PA 292 was paved in the 1930s.

== Major intersections ==
The entire route is in Wyoming County.

Location	mi	km	Destinations	Notes
Eaton Township	0.000	0.000	PA 29 (Hunter Highway) – Dallas, Tunkhannock	Western terminus
Exeter Township	11.483	18.480	PA 92 (Sullivan Trail) – Tunkhannock, Pittston	Eastern terminus
1.000 mi = 1.609 km; 1.000 km = 0.621 mi
