= Exeter (disambiguation) =

Exeter is the county town of Devon.

It may also refer to:

== Places ==
=== Australia ===
- Exeter, New South Wales
- Exeter, South Australia
- Exeter, Tasmania

=== Canada ===
- Exeter, Ontario

=== United Kingdom ===
- Exeter, Devon—the original location
  - Exeter (unitary authority area), a unitary authority area due to be formed in 2028
  - Exeter (constituency)
  - University of Exeter

=== United States ===
- Exeter, California
- Exeter, a village of the town of Lebanon, Connecticut
- Exeter, Illinois
- Exeter, Maine
- Exeter (Federalsburg, Maryland), a historic home
- Exeter Township, Michigan
- Exeter, Missouri
- Exeter, Nebraska
- Exeter, New Hampshire, a New England town
  - Exeter (CDP), New Hampshire, the central urban area of the town
  - Phillips Exeter Academy, an independent secondary school
  - Exeter High School (New Hampshire), a public school
  - Exeter incident, a 1965 UFO case
- Exeter, New York
- Exeter, Pennsylvania
- Exeter, Rhode Island
- Exeter, Virginia
- Exeter, Wisconsin, a town
  - Exeter (community), Wisconsin, an unincorporated community within the town
- Exeter Township, Pennsylvania (disambiguation)
- Exeter (Leesburg, Virginia), a historic home

== Fiction ==
- Starship Exeter, a fan film
- Exeter (comics), a fictional bounty hunter in the CrossGen Sigilverse
- Exeter, the leader of the aliens in the film This Island Earth
- Exeter (film), a 2015 horror film

== Ships ==
- HMS Exeter, several Royal Navy ships
- Exeter (ship), several merchant ships

== Other uses ==
- Exeter (album), by Bladee
- Exeter Book, an Old English codex
- Exeter Branch, a rail line in California
- Exeter College, Oxford, England
- Exeter station (disambiguation), several stations
- Bishop of Exeter
- Diocese of Exeter
- Duke of Exeter
- Earl of Exeter
- Marquess of Exeter
