= Wyalusing Area School District =

School district in Pennsylvania

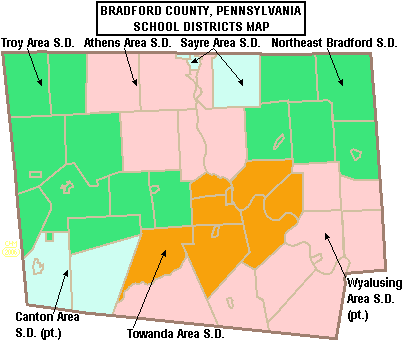

Address
- 42 Main Street, PO Box 157, Wyalusing, Pennsylvania, Bradford County, Wyoming County, Pennsylvania, 18853; United States

District information
- Type: Public

Students and staff
- District mascot: Rams
- Colors: Green and gold

Other information
- Website: www.wyalusingrams.com

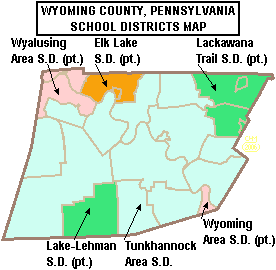
Wyalusing Area School District region in Wyoming County

The Wyalusing Area School District is a small enrollment, rural, public school district in northern Pennsylvania. It spans portions of two counties. Wyalusing Area School District encompasses approximately 273 square miles (710 km^{2}). In southeastern Bradford County the district serves the Boroughs of New Albany and Wyalusing and Albany Township, Herrick Township, Overton Township, Stevens Township, Terry Township, Tuscarora Township, Wilmot Township and Wyalusing Township. In northwestern Wyoming County it serves the Borough of Laceyville and Braintrim Township and the northern and eastern portions of Windham Township. According to 2010 federal census data, it serves a resident population of 9,202. In 2009, the Wyalusing Area School District residents' per capita income was $16,780, while the median family income was $38,279. In the Commonwealth, the median family income was $49,501 and the United States median family income was $49,445, in 2010. By 2013, the median household income in the United States rose to $52,100.

Wyalusing Area School District operates Wyalusing Valley Elementary School and Wyalusing Valley Junior-Senior High School. The Wyalusing Area School District consolidated its elementary schools. Four elementary schools in the district were closed and replaced with a new Wyalusing Valley Elementary School. Closed schools were: Camptown Elementary School, New Albany Elementary School, Laceyville Elementary School and Wyalusing Elementary School.

== Extracurriculars ==
Wyalusing Area School District offers a variety of clubs, activities and sports.

=== Sports ===
- Boys: cross country, football, wrestling, basketball, baseball, track and field.
- Girls: cross country, soccer, volleyball, basketball, softball, track and field.

According to PIAA directory July 2012.
