= Exeter Township, Pennsylvania =

Exeter Township is the name of some places in the U.S. state of Pennsylvania:

- Exeter Township, Berks County, Pennsylvania
- Exeter Township, Luzerne County, Pennsylvania
- Exeter Township, Wyoming County, Pennsylvania

== See also ==
- Exeter Township (disambiguation)
