= Skyhaven Airport (Pennsylvania) =

Airport in Eaton Township, Pennsylvania, US

- IATA: none; ICAO: none; FAA LID: 76N

Summary
- Airport type: Public
- Owner: Skyhaven Airport Inc
- Serves: Tunkhannock, Pennsylvania
- Elevation AMSL: 639 ft / 195 m
- Coordinates: 41°31′45″N 075°56′49″W
- Interactive map of Skyhaven Airport

Runways
Direction	Length		Surface
Direction	ft	m	Surface
1/19	3,100	612	Asphalt

Statistics (2009)
- Aircraft operations: 21,690
- Based aircraft: 55
- Source: Federal Aviation Administration

Skyhaven Airport (FAA LID: 76N) is a public use airport located in Eaton Township, Wyoming County, Pennsylvania, United States. The airport is one nautical mile (1.85 km) south of the central business district of the borough of Tunkhannock.

== Facilities and aircraft ==
Skyhaven Airport covers an area of 70 acres (28 ha) at an elevation of 639 feet (195 m) above mean sea level. It has one runway designated 1/19 with an asphalt surface measuring 3,100 by 50 feet (945 x 15 m).

For the 12-month period ending June 16, 2009, the airport had 21,690 aircraft operations, an average of 59 per day: 99.9% general aviation and 0.1% military. At that time there were 55 aircraft based at this airport: 91% single-engine, 7% multi-engine and 2% ultralight. Skyhaven is known in the area for its vintage aircraft and aircraft maintenance operations.

== See also ==
- List of airports in Pennsylvania
