= West Falls, Pennsylvania =

- census-designated place
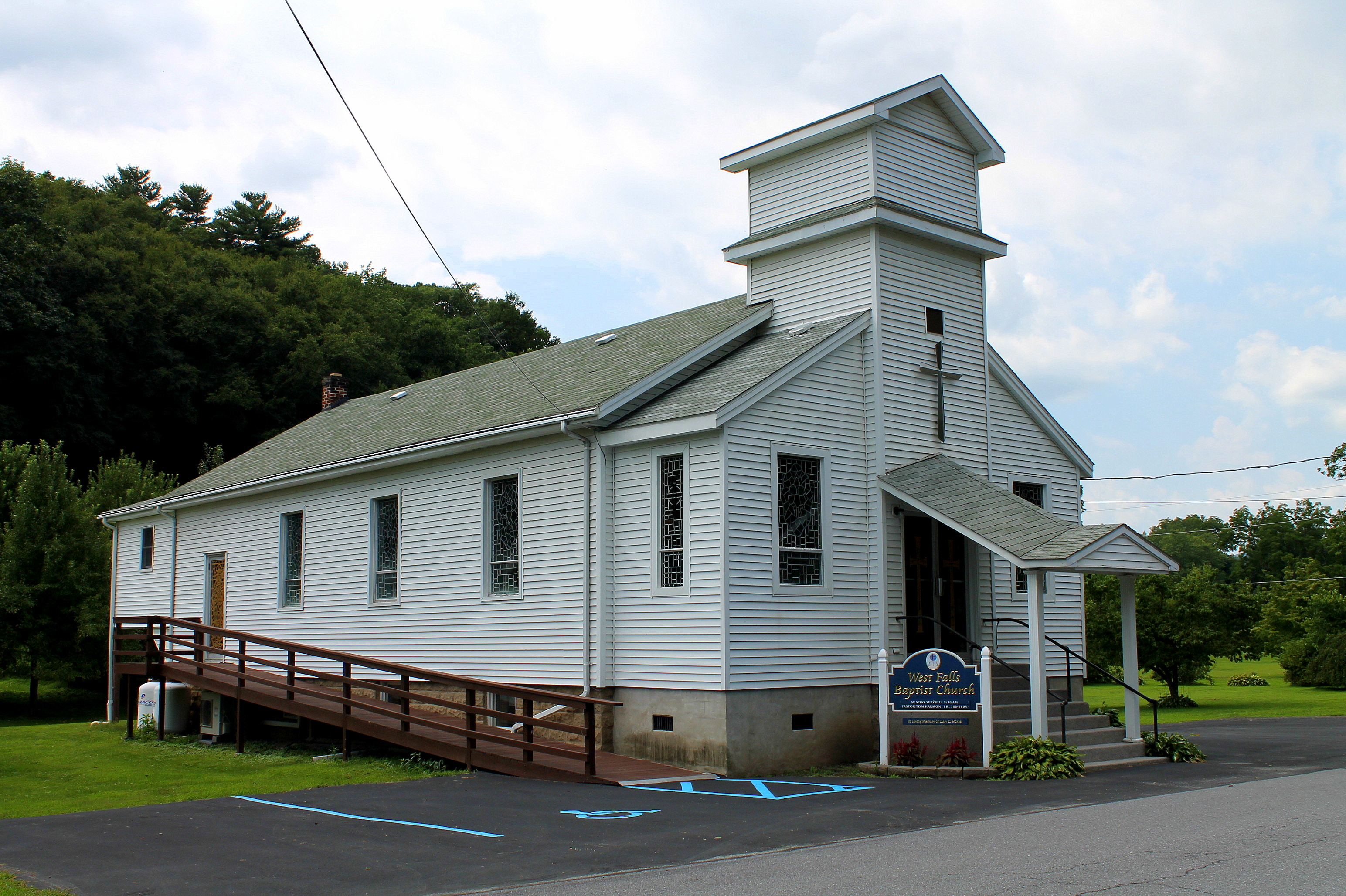
- West Falls Baptist Church

- Location of West Falls within the state of Pennsylvania West Falls (the United States)
- Coordinates: 41°27′11″N 75°51′38″W
- Country: United States
- State: Pennsylvania
- County: Wyoming

Population (2020)
  - Total: 337
- Time zone: UTC-5 (Eastern (EST))
  - Summer (DST): UTC-4 (EDT)

West Falls is a census-designated place located in Exeter Township, Wyoming County, in the state of Pennsylvania. The community is located very close to Pennsylvania Route 92 near the Susquehanna River. As of the 2010 census the population was 382 residents. At the 2020 census the population was 337.

== Demographics ==
Historical population
Census	Pop.	Note	%±
2010	382		—
2020	337		−11.8%

At the census of 2020, there were 337 residents of West Falls. Of these, 316 (94.66%) were white alone, 1 (0.3%) was Native Hawaiian and Pacific Islander, 2 (0.59%) were of other races, and 18 (5.34%) were of two or more races.

As of the 2022 American Community Survey, the CDP had 159 households of which 84 (60.43%) had married couples living in them, 21 of which (15.11%) had a married couple with a child under age 18 living with them. The average household size was 1.94 and the average family size was 2.49.
