= Tunkhannock Historic District =

Historic district in Pennsylvania, United States

- U.S. National Register of Historic Places
- U.S. Historic district
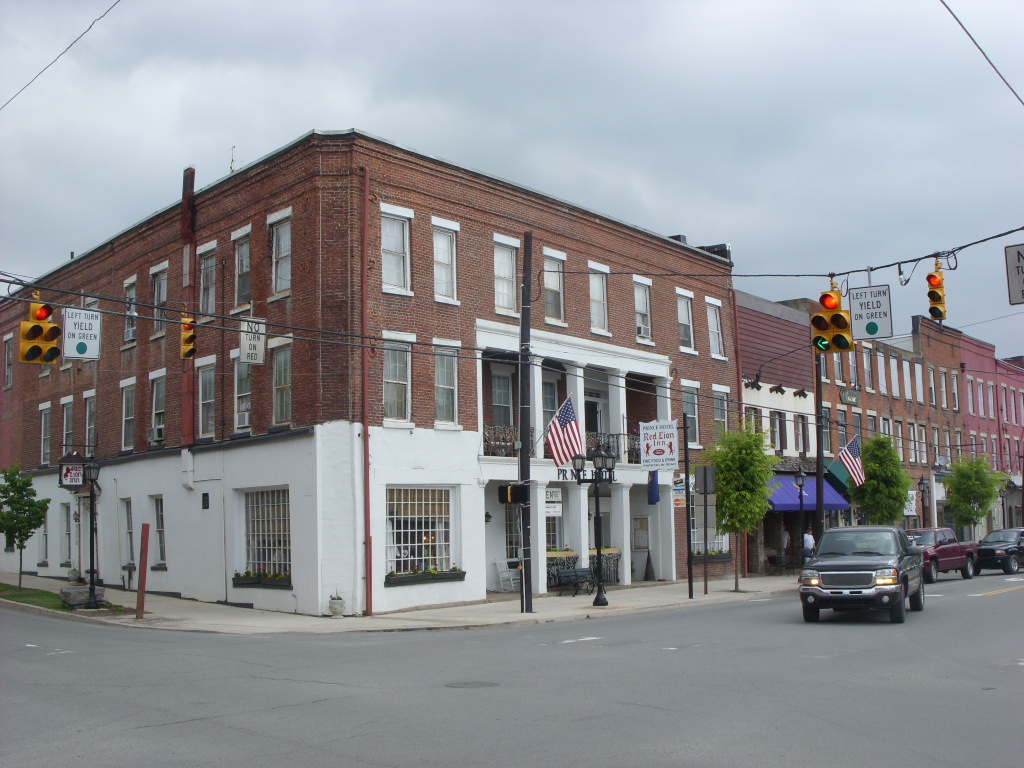
- Prince Hotel, May 2009

- Location within Pennsylvania Location within the United States
- Location: Roughly bounded by Tioga, Pine, Harrison Sts., and Wyoming Ave., Tunkhannock, Pennsylvania
- Coordinates: 41°32′20″N 75°56′49″W
- Area: 69.1 acres (28.0 ha)
- Built: 1842
- Architect: Nott, D.R.; Barber, Charles Franklin
- Architectural style: Queen Anne, Italianate, et al.
- NRHP reference No.: 05000101
- Added to NRHP: July 27, 2005

The Tunkhannock Historic District is a national historic district that is located in Tunkhannock, Wyoming County, Pennsylvania.

It was added to the National Register of Historic Places in 2005.

== History and architectural features ==
This district encompasses 225 contributing buildings that are located in the central business district and surrounding residential areas of Tunkhannock. These are residential, commercial, and institutional structures that were built between 1841 and 1954 and designed in a variety of popular architectural styles, including Queen Anne and Italianate. Notable buildings include the Bolles-Bardwell-Tewksbury Building (c. 1842), the Prince Hotel (1844), the Phelps Building (1844-1845), the Dietrich Theater (1925), the former Masonic Hall (c. 1876), Stark Block (late 1850s), the Wyoming County Courthouse (1843, 1870), the Palen-Ervine House (1868), the Piatt-Ogden House (1896), the Presbyterian Church of Tunkhannock (1891), and First United Methodist Church (1934).

It was added to the National Register of Historic Places in 2005.
