= Miller Mountain (Wyoming County, Pennsylvania) =

Mountain in Pennsylvania, United States

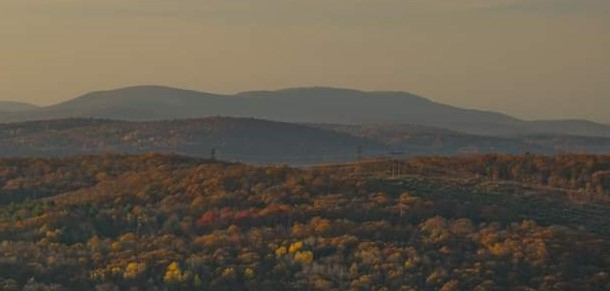
- Miller Mountain

Highest point
- Elevation: 2,216 ft (675 m)
- Prominence: 1,090 feet (330 m)
- Coordinates: 41°29.34′N 75°57.13′W

Geography
- Location: Wyoming County, Pennsylvania, U.S.
- Parent range: Appalachian Mountains
- Topo map: USGS Center Moreland (PA) Quadrangle

Miller Mountain is a peak that is located in Wyoming County, Pennsylvania. One of the more recognizable peaks in the Endless Mountains region of the Commonwealth, it is a "stand alone" peak, which is separated from the remainder of the Allegheny Plateau.

In 2023, Miller Mountain was purchased by the state, and added to the Pinchot State Forest.

The Susquehanna River flows past the mountain where the slopes rise to over 1,600 feet (490 m) above the riverbanks and the town of Tunkhannock.
