= WVHS =

W-VHS is a high-definition analog videotape format.

WVHS as a four letter acronym may also stand for a number of different high schools:

- Walker Valley High School in Tennessee
- Warwick Valley High School in Warwick, New York
- Waubonsie Valley High School in Aurora, Illinois
- West Valley High School in Fairbanks, Alaska
- West Valley High School in Cottonwood, California
- West Valley High School in Hemet, California
- West Valley High School in Yakima, Washington
- Wilsonville High School in Wilsonville, Oregon
- Wyalusing Valley Junior-Senior High School in Wyalusing, Pennsylvania
- Westview High School (San Diego) in San Diego, California
