= Exeter station =

Exeter station or Exeter railway station may refer to:

Australia:

- Exeter railway station, New South Wales, serving Exeter, New South Wales
- Exeter railway station, Adelaide, South Australia, A former station on the Semaphore railway line

England:

- Exeter Central railway station, a London and South Western Railway station in Exeter, Devon, England
- Exeter St Davids railway station, a Great Western Railway station in Exeter, Devon, England
- Exeter St Thomas railway station, a Great Western Railway in Exeter, Devon, England
- Other railway stations in Exeter

United States:

- Exeter station (New Hampshire), an Amtrak station in Exeter, New Hampshire

== See also ==
- Exeter (disambiguation)
