= Pennsylvania Route 92 =

State highway in Pennsylvania, United States

Pennsylvania Route 92
- PA 92 in red and PA 92 Truck in blue

Route information
- Maintained by PennDOT
- Length: 66.7 mi (107.3 km)
- Tourist routes: Viaduct Valley Way Scenic Byway

Major junctions
- South end: US 11 in West Pittston
- PA 292 in Exeter Township; PA 307 in Tunkhannock Township; US 6 in Tunkhannock; US 6 Bus. in Tunkhannock; US 11 in Nicholson; PA 374 in Lenox Township; I-81 / PA 106 in Lenox Township; PA 492 in Jackson Township; PA 171 in Susquehanna Depot
- North end: NY 79 in Oakland Township

Location
- Country: United States
- State: Pennsylvania
- Counties: Luzerne, Wyoming, Susquehanna

Highway system
- Pennsylvania State Route System; Interstate; US; State; Scenic; Legislative
← PA 91	→ PA 93

Pennsylvania Route 92 (PA 92) is a 66-mile-long (106 km) north–south state highway located in northeast Pennsylvania. The southern terminus of the route is at U.S. Route 11 (US 11) in West Pittston. The northern terminus is at the New York-Pennsylvania border in Oakland Township, where the road continues northward as New York State Route 79 (NY 79).

== Route description ==
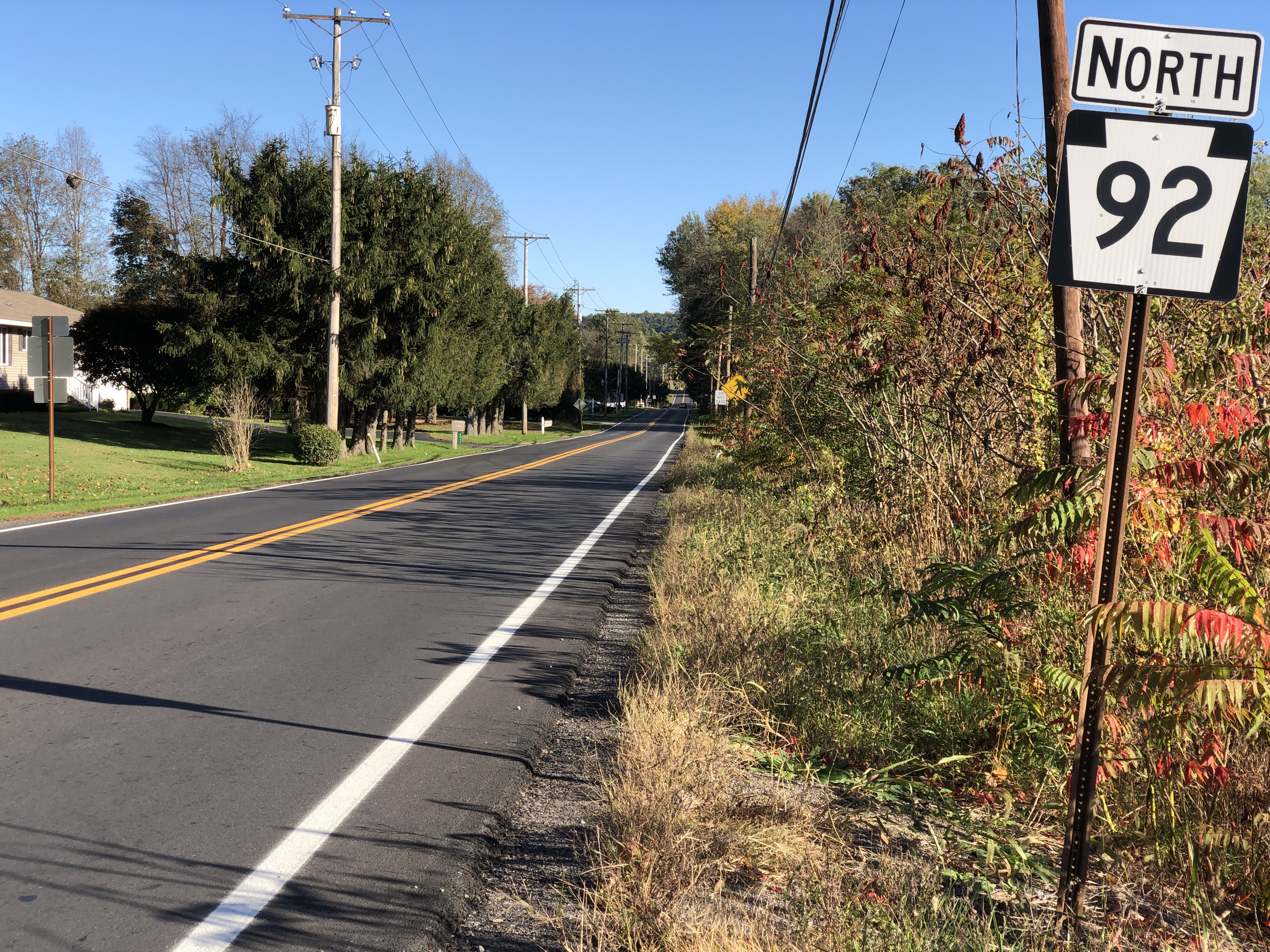
PA 92 northbound past PA 292 in Exeter Township, Wyoming County

PA 92 begins at an intersection with US 11 in the borough of West Pittston in Luzerne County, heading northwest on two-lane undivided Exeter Avenue. The road heads through residential areas, crossing a Luzerne and Susquehanna Railway line before continuing past more homes with some businesses. The route heads into the borough of Exeter and turns north onto Exeter Avenue, heading through more developed areas a short distance to the west of the North Branch Susquehanna River. PA 92 curves northwest and continues into forested areas to the southwest of the river, crossing into Exeter Township and becoming Sullivan Trail. The road heads north past homes in the community of Harding, running through farmland with some development before continuing northeast into more forests. The route turns northwest at Stanton Station and continues west along the south bank of the North Branch Susquehanna River, curving north into rural areas of homes and passing through Upper Exeter.

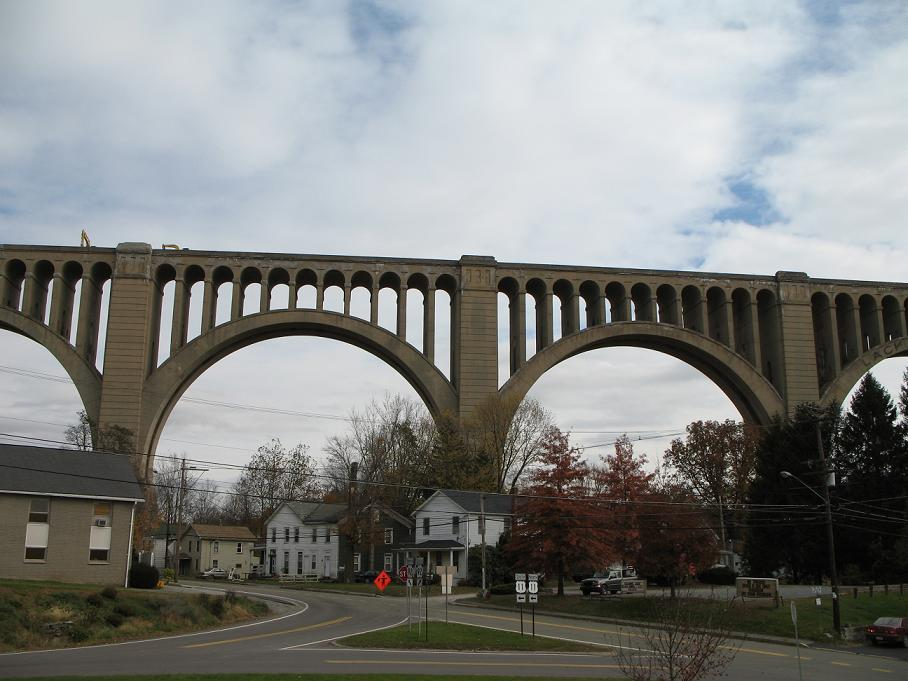
PA 92 at interchange with US 11 in Nicholson, with Tunkhannock Viaduct in background

PA 92 enters Exeter Township in Wyoming County and becomes an unnamed road, heading northwest through forests to the southwest of the North Branch Susquehanna River. The road continues through wooded areas with some homes and curves north, intersecting the eastern terminus of PA 292. The route heads through woodland with some farm fields and residences, turning northeast to cross the river into Falls Township, passing over the Reading Blue Mountain and Northern Railroad's Susquehanna Branch line after the river. At this point, PA 92 turns northwest to run to the northeast of the railroad tracks and the river through forests, curving to the west. The road heads farther north from the river and railroad line, passing through wooded areas with a few homes. The route turns northwest and resumes alongside the Reading Blue Mountain and Northern Railroad line and the North Branch Susquehanna River, heading through a mix of farmland and woodland with some residences and passing through McKune. PA 92 crosses into Tunkhannock Township and becomes Osterhout Road, turning to the northeast. The road curves to the northwest again and intersects the northern terminus of PA 307 in Osterhout. The route becomes Roosevelt Highway and heads west through farmland before heading into wooded areas of homes. PA 92 turns north and heads into forested areas to the east of the railroad line and the river, becoming an unnamed road. The route heads into commercial areas before intersecting US 6, at which point it turns east to form a concurrency with that route.

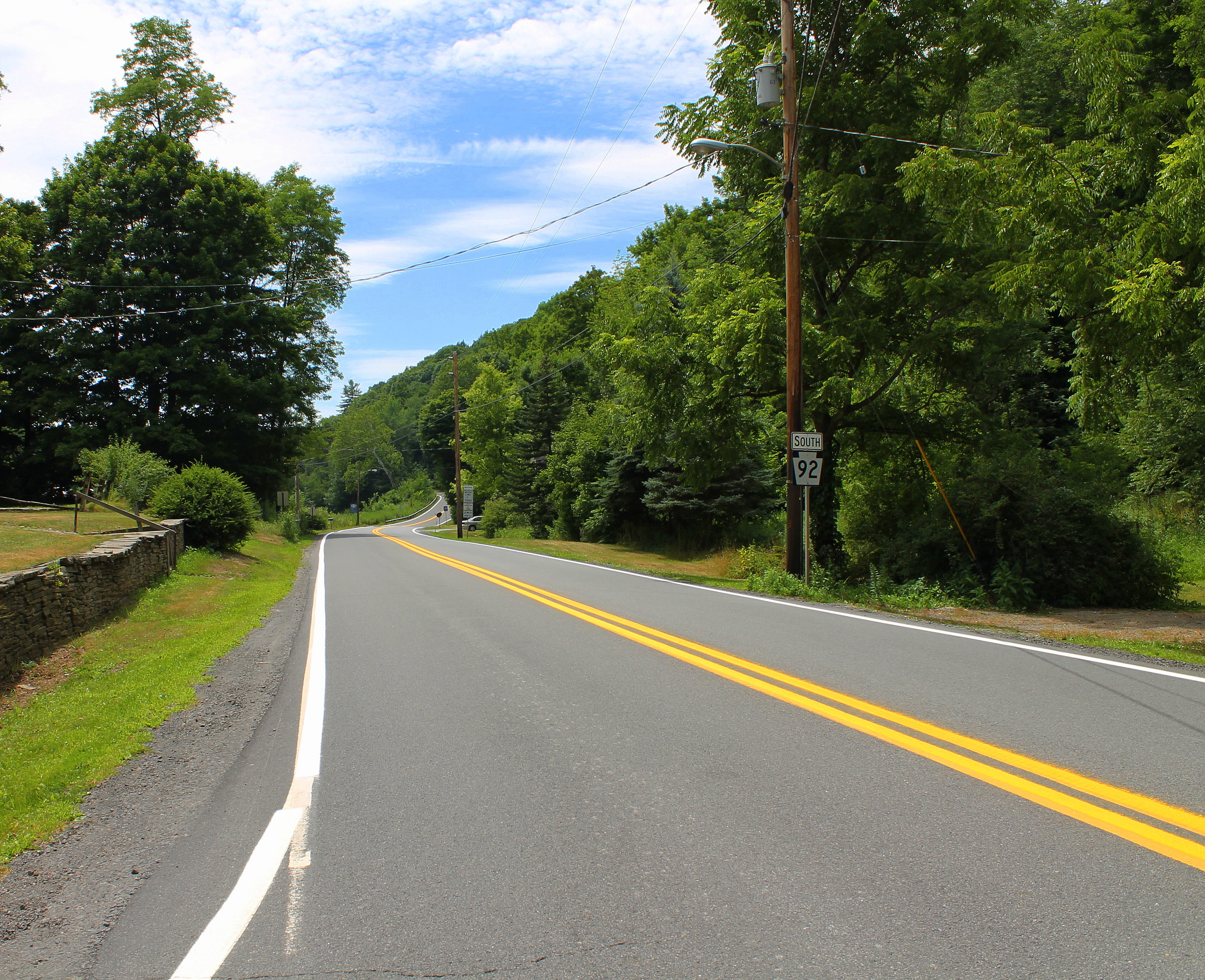
PA 92 west of Nicholson

The road crosses the Tunkhannock Creek and intersects the eastern terminus of US 6 Business through the borough of Tunkhannock. At this point, US 6/PA 92 becomes Grand Army of the Republic Highway and heads northeast through wooded areas with some development, crossing the creek again. The two routes cross the Tunkhannock Creek a third time before curving to the east and widening into a divided highway. PA 92 splits from US 6 by turning north onto an unnamed two-lane undivided road, passing through Dixon. The road continues through woodland with some fields and homes, running along the west bank of the creek. The route heads into dense forests with occasional residences and curves to the east, turning north again and crossing into Lemon Township. PA 92 turns northeast and passes through East Lemon, turning east into farmland. The road enters Nicholson Township and heads into forests turning north as it continues alongside the Tunkhannock Creek. The route heads through more wooded areas with some homes and curves east, passing through Starkville. PA 92 winds east through more woodland with some fields to the north of the creek, heading into the borough of Nicholson and becoming State Street. The road passes homes and heads into commercial areas, interchanging with US 11. The route passes under the Tunkhannock Viaduct, which carries Norfolk Southern's Sunbury Line over the route and the Tunkhannock Creek, before crossing back into Nicholson Township and running through forests with some farm fields and residences as an unnamed road, curving more to the northeast.

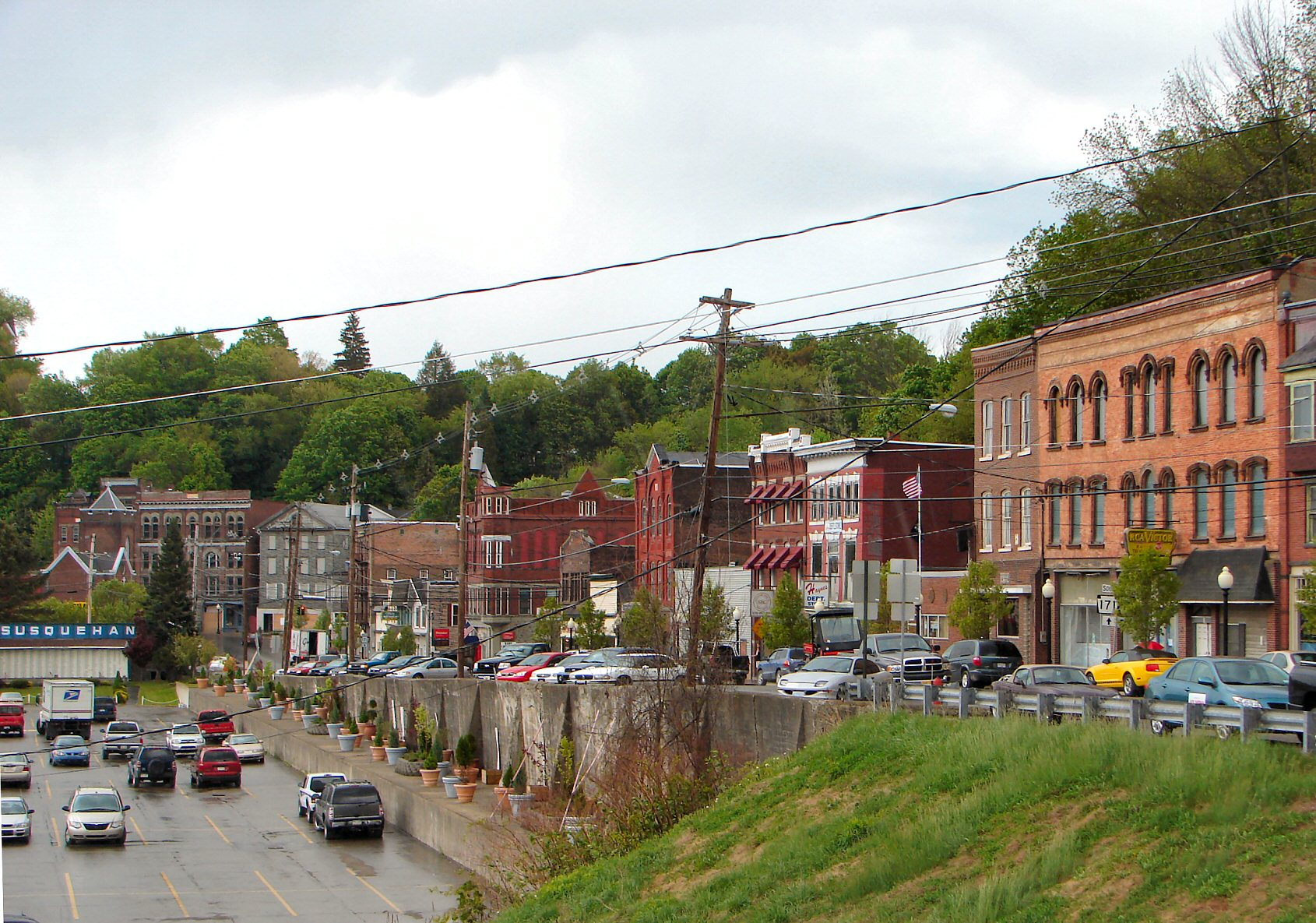
PA 92 heads through the community of Susquehanna Depot along with PA 171.

PA 92 enters Lenox Township in Susquehanna County and heads north through more forests to the west of the Tunkhannock Creek, intersecting the western terminus of PA 374. The road passes through Glenwood and runs through more woodland with some farm fields and homes, curving to the northeast. The route turns north again as it comes to an intersection with PA 106 in Lenox. Past this, PA 92 turns northeast into a commercial area and crosses Nine Partners Creek, coming to an interchange with access to and from the northbound direction of I-81. Access to and from southbound I-81 is provided by PA 106. After this interchange, the road heads through more forests with some fields and homes, crossing into Gibson Township and passing through South Gibson. The route runs through more rural areas, curving more to the north and passing through Gelatt. PA 92 heads into Jackson Township and runs through more woodland with some farm fields and residences, reaching an intersection with the eastern terminus of PA 492 in Jackson. The road continues north through more farmland and woods with some homes past this intersection. Farther north, the route turns northeast before heading north-northwest and entering Oakland Township. PA 92 continues through dense forests with some homes, heading into the borough of Susquehanna Depot. At this point, the road becomes Franklin Avenue and passes homes, reaching an intersection with PA 171. Here, the route turns west to form a concurrency with PA 171 on West Main Street, heading through the commercial downtown. The two routes turn north onto Exchange Street and come to a bridge that carry them over the Southern Tier Line, which is owned by Norfolk Southern and operated by the Central New York Railroad, and the North Branch Susquehanna River. After crossing the river, the road heads into the borough of Oakland, where PA 171 turns to the west and PA 92 turns east onto East River Street. The route passes homes on the north bank of the river before crossing back into Oakland Township and becoming unnamed, passing through a mix of farmland and woodland with some homes. The road turns to the north and heads through forested areas with occasional residences. PA 92 continues through more forests with some farm fields and homes before reaching the New York border, where the road continues into that state as NY 79.

Between Tunkhannock and Susquehanna Depot, PA 92 is known as the Viaduct Valley Way Scenic Byway, a Pennsylvania Scenic Byway.

== Major intersections ==
County	Location	mi	km	Destinations	Notes
Luzerne	West Pittston	0.0	0.0	US 11 (Wyoming Avenue) – Scranton, Wilkes-Barre, Exeter	Southern terminus
Wyoming	Exeter Township	10.2	16.4	PA 292 west – Keelersburg, Center Moreland	Eastern terminus of PA 292
Wyoming	Tunkhannock Township	17.3	27.8	PA 307 south (Roosevelt Highway) – Lake Winola, Scranton	Northern terminus of PA 307
Wyoming	Tunkhannock Township	21.5	34.6	US 6 west – Towanda, Montrose	South end of US 6 overlap
Wyoming	Tunkhannock Township	21.7	34.9	US 6 Bus. west (East Tioga Street) – Tunkhannock	Eastern terminus of US 6 Bus.
Wyoming	Tunkhannock Township	24.0	38.6	US 6 east – Scranton	North end of US 6 overlap
Wyoming	Nicholson	33.6	54.1	US 11 (Lackawanna Trail) – Binghamton	Interchange
Susquehanna	Lenox Township	37.4	60.2	PA 374 east	Western terminus of PA 374
Susquehanna	Lenox Township	42.9	69.0	PA 106 to I-81 south – Kingsley, Carbondale	
Susquehanna	Lenox Township	43.2	69.5	I-81 north – Binghamton	I-81 exit 211
Susquehanna	Jackson Township	54.1	87.1	PA 492 west	Eastern terminus of PA 492
Susquehanna	Susquehanna Depot	62.1	99.9	PA 171 south (East Main Street)	South end of PA 171 overlap
Susquehanna	Oakland	62.5	100.6	PA 171 north (River Street) to I-81	North end of PA 171 overlap
Susquehanna	Oakland Township	66.7	107.3	NY 79 west	New York state line; northern terminus
1.000 mi = 1.609 km; 1.000 km = 0.621 mi: Concurrency terminus; Incomplete access

== PA 92 Truck ==
Pennsylvania Route 92 Truck
- Location: Wyoming County
- Existed: 2013–present

Pennsylvania Route 92 Truck is a truck route that bypasses two weight-restricted bridges; one over the Monroe Creek on which trucks over 14 tons and combination loads over 20 tons are prohibited, and one over Field Brook on which trucks over 34 tons and combination loads over 40 tons are prohibited. The route follows US 6 and US 11 through Wyoming County, Pennsylvania. PA 92 Truck was signed in 2013.

Another bridge over a tributary of the Susquehanna River has been weight restricted for loads over 20 tons, but as of 2018 a truck route has not been signed.
