= Exeter Township =

Exeter Township may refer to:

- Exeter Township, Clay County, Kansas
- Exeter Township, Monroe County, Michigan
- Exeter Township, Barry County, Missouri
- Exeter Township, Berks County, Pennsylvania
- Exeter Township, Luzerne County, Pennsylvania
- Exeter Township, Wyoming County, Pennsylvania

== See also ==
- Exeter-Fairmont Consolidated Township, Fillmore County, Nebraska
