= Exeter (ship) =

Several ships have borne the name Exeter after the city of Exeter in Devon:

- Exeter (1792 EIC ship) was an East Indiaman launched in 1792 that made eight voyages to the East Indies for the East India Company (EIC). More unusually, on separate voyages she captured a French frigate and participated in the Battle of Pulo Aura. She was sold for breaking up in 1811.
- Exeter (1793 ship) was launched at Calcutta in 1793 and then made three voyages to England from Calcutta for the EIC before foundering in 1806.

== See also ==
- HMS Exeter - one of five ships of the British Royal Navy
