= Robert F. Wilner =

American Episcopal/Anglican bishop

Styles of Robert F. Wilner
- Religious style: The Right Reverend

Robert Franklin Wilner (April 10, 1889 – March 25, 1960) was an Episcopal Suffragan Bishop of the Philippine Islands.

He was born in Forty Fort, Pennsylvania to George Mortimer Wilner and Lillian Isabel Wilner (née Price). He married Alfaretta Amburn Stark on April 10, 1917.

He graduated at the Philadelphia Divinity School and was ordained a deacon in 1928. He was later ordained priest in 1929. He was elected as suffragan bishop of the Philippines in October 1937. He was consecrated to the episcopate on January 25, 1938 in the Cathedral Church of Saints Mary and John, Manila. He died in Tunkhannock, Pennsylvania.

== Consecrators ==
Wilner was consecrated on January 25, 1938 by:

- Gouverneur Frank Mosher
- Charles S. Reifsnider (assistant)
- Ronald Owen Hall (assistant)
