= Laceyville, Pennsylvania =

Borough in Pennsylvania, US

Borough of Laceyville
- Borough
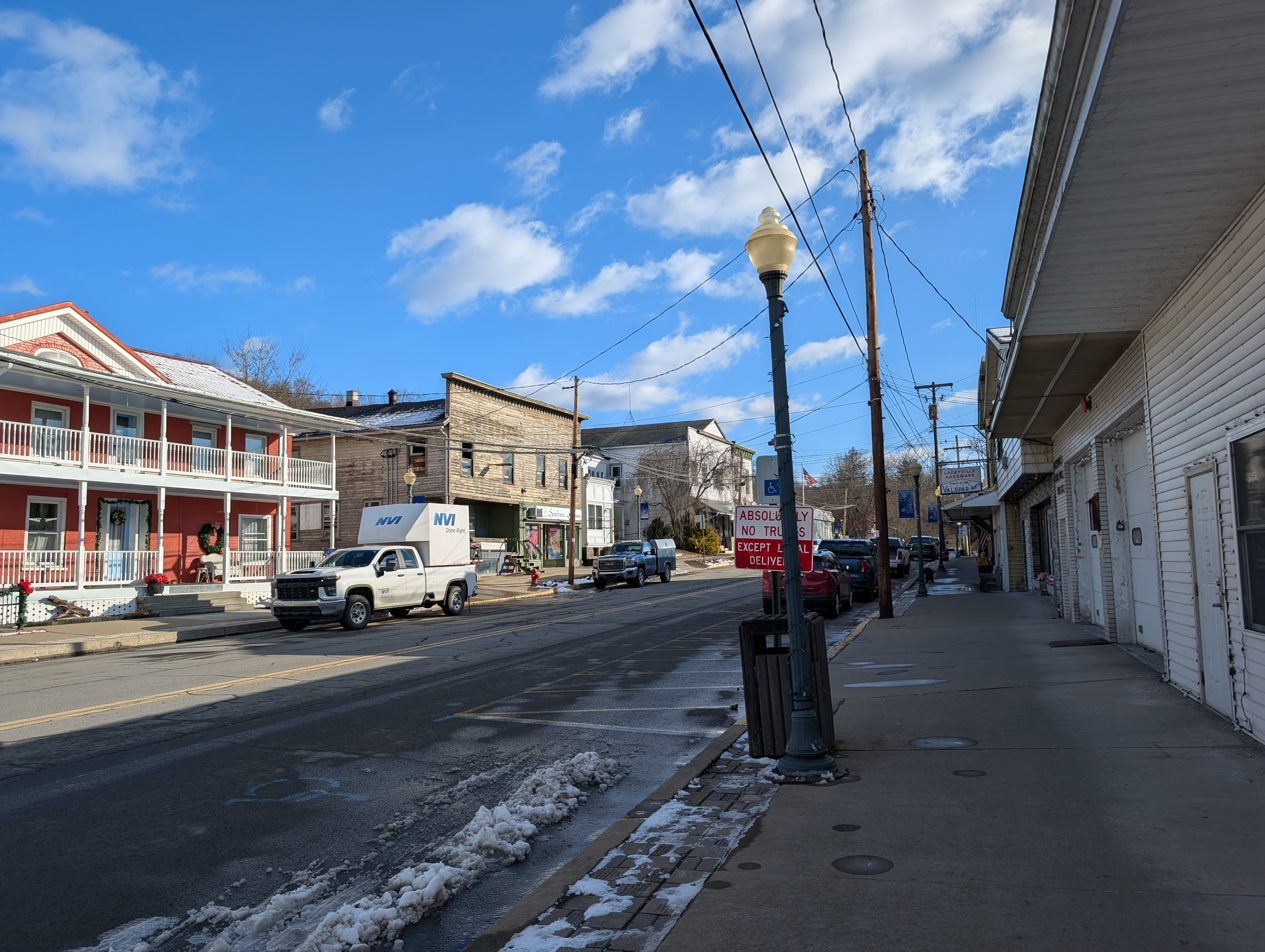
- Main Street Laceyville

- Location of Laceyville in Wyoming County, Pennsylvania.

- Location of Laceyville in Pennsylvania Laceyville (the United States)
- Coordinates: 41°38′43″N 76°09′38″W
- Country: United States
- State: Pennsylvania
- County: Wyoming

Government
  - Mayor: Jeffrey Shotwell

Area
  - Total: 0.20 sq mi (0.52 km^{2})
  - Land: 0.19 sq mi (0.50 km^{2})
  - Water: 0.0077 sq mi (0.02 km^{2})
- Elevation: 620 ft (190 m)

Population (2020)
  - Total: 361
  - Density: 1,868.5/sq mi (721.44/km^{2})
- Time zone: UTC-5 (EST)
  - Summer (DST): UTC-4 (EDT)
- ZIP Code: 18623
- Area code: 570
- FIPS code: 42-40744
- Website: www.laceyvillepa.org

Laceyville is a borough that is located in Wyoming County, Pennsylvania, United States. The population was 363 at the time of the 2020 census.

== Geography ==
Laceyville is located at 41°38′43″N 76°9′38″W (41.645337, -76.160451).

According to the United States Census Bureau, the borough has a total area of 0.2 square miles (0.52 km^{2}), all land.

== Demographics ==
Historical population
| Census | Pop. | Note | %± |
|---|---|---|---|
| 1910 | 479 | | — |
| 1920 | 466 | | −2.7% |
| 1930 | 467 | | 0.2% |
| 1940 | 491 | | 5.1% |
| 1950 | 505 | | 2.9% |
| 1960 | 468 | | −7.3% |
| 1970 | 452 | | −3.4% |
| 1980 | 498 | | 10.2% |
| 1990 | 436 | | −12.4% |
| 2000 | 396 | | −9.2% |
| 2010 | 379 | | −4.3% |
| 2020 | 361 | | −4.7% |
| 2021 (est.) | 362 | ▲ | 0.3% |

At the 2000 census, there were 379 people, 160 households and 102 families residing in the borough.

The population density was 1,895 inhabitants per square mile (732/km^{2}). There were 185 housing units at an average density of 925 per square mile (357/km^{2}).

The racial makeup of the borough was 94.5% White, 0.5% African American, 4.7% some other race, and 0.3% from two or more races. Hispanic or Latino of any race were 7.9% of the population.

There were 160 households, of which 32.5% had children under the age of eighteen living with them; 44.4% were married couples living together, 13.1% had a female householder with no husband present, and 36.3% were non-families. 32.5% of all households were made up of individuals, and 12.5% had someone living alone who was sixty-five years of age or older.

The average household size was 2.37 and the average family size was 2.89.

23.7% of the population were under the age of eighteen, 61.8% were aged eighteen to sixty-four, and 14.5% were aged sixty-five or older. The median age was 39.4 years.

The median household income was $46,667 and the median family income was $58,542. Males had a median income of $32,125 compared with that of $25,000 for females.

The per capita income was $18,594.

Approximately 14.4% of families and 15.1% of the population were living below the poverty line, including 22.6% of those who were under the age of eighteen and 18.2% of those who were aged sixty-five or older.

== Gallery ==
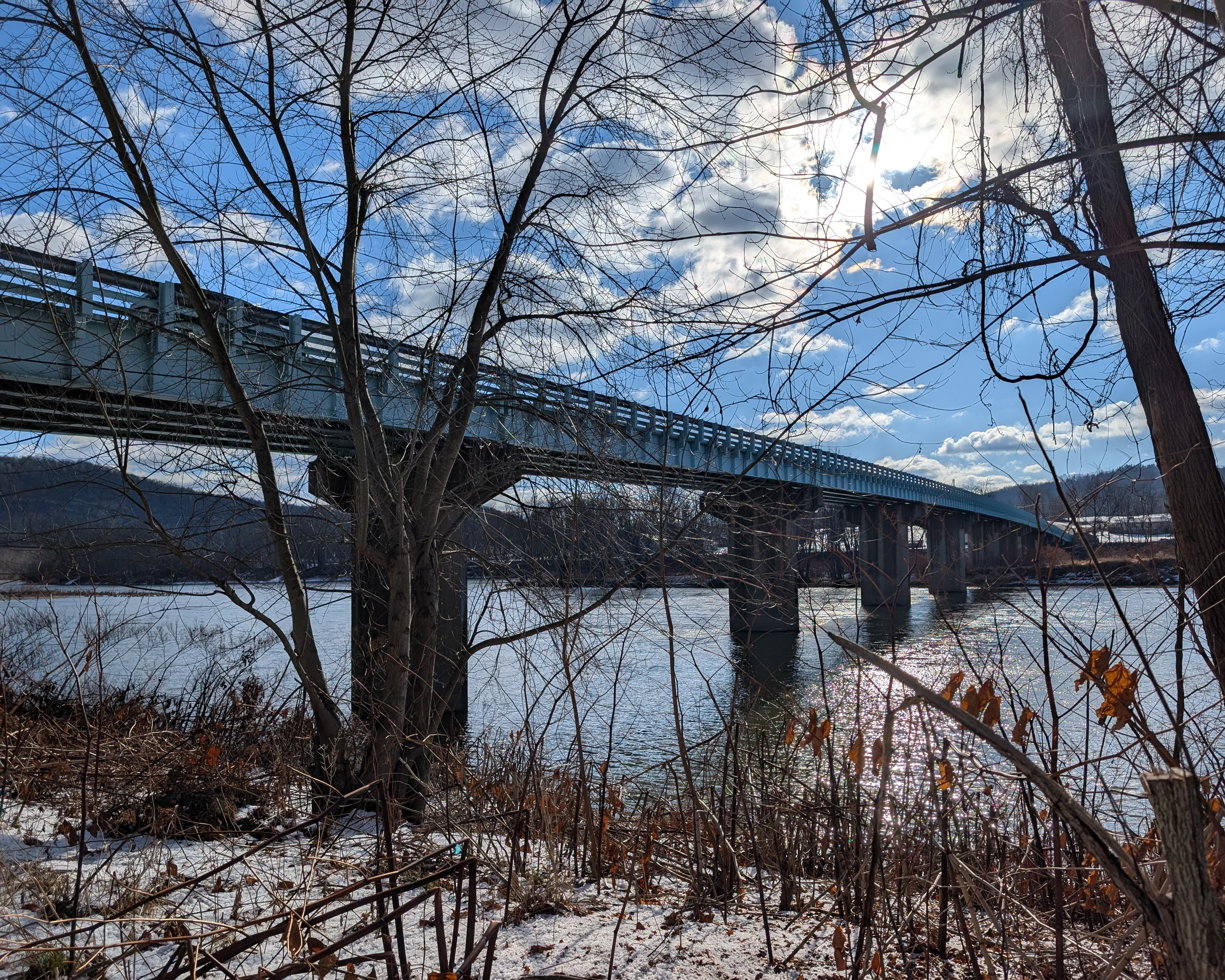
Church Street Bridge Laceyville (SR 3001)

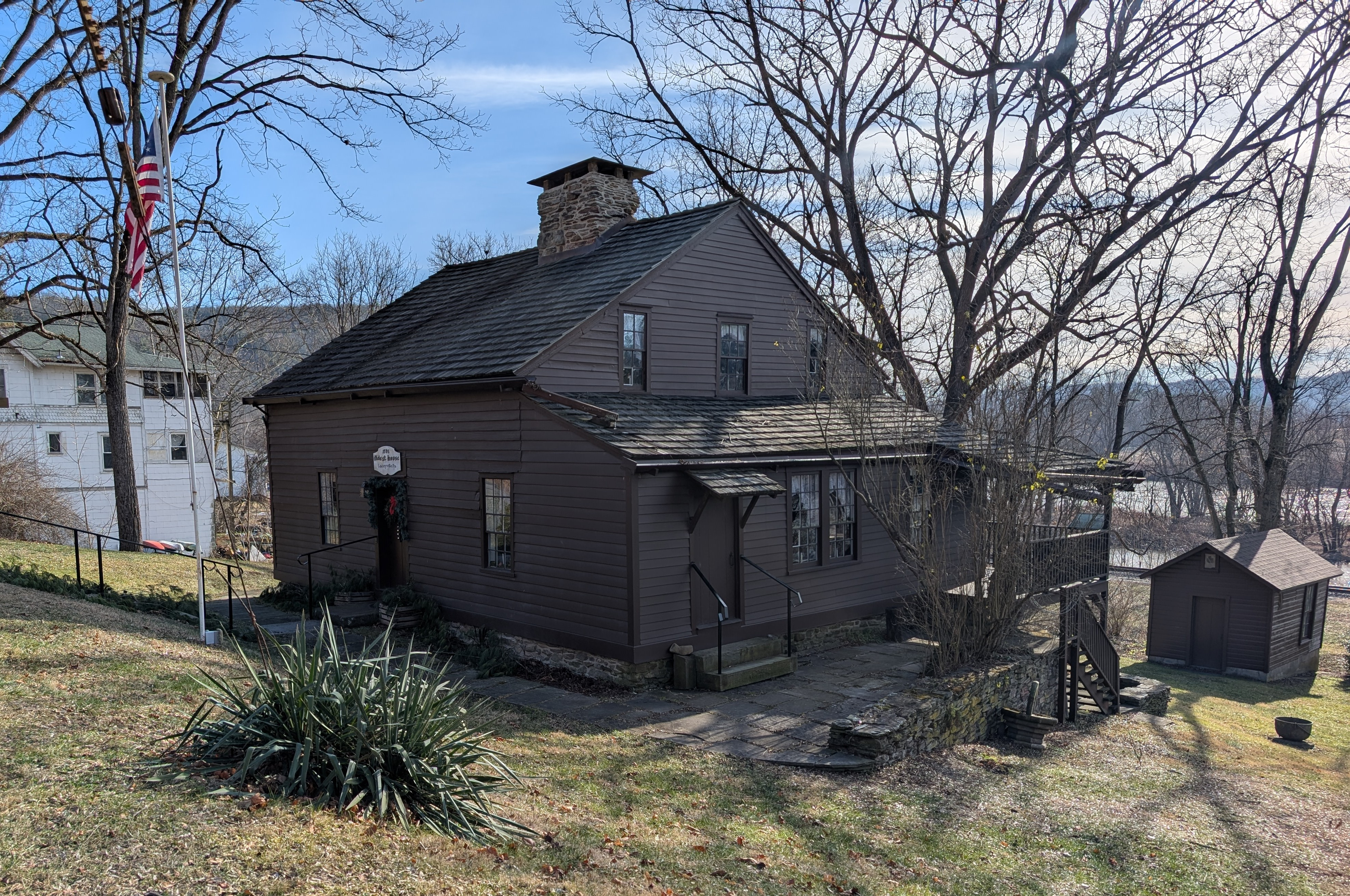
Oldest House in Laceyville Pennsylvania Region

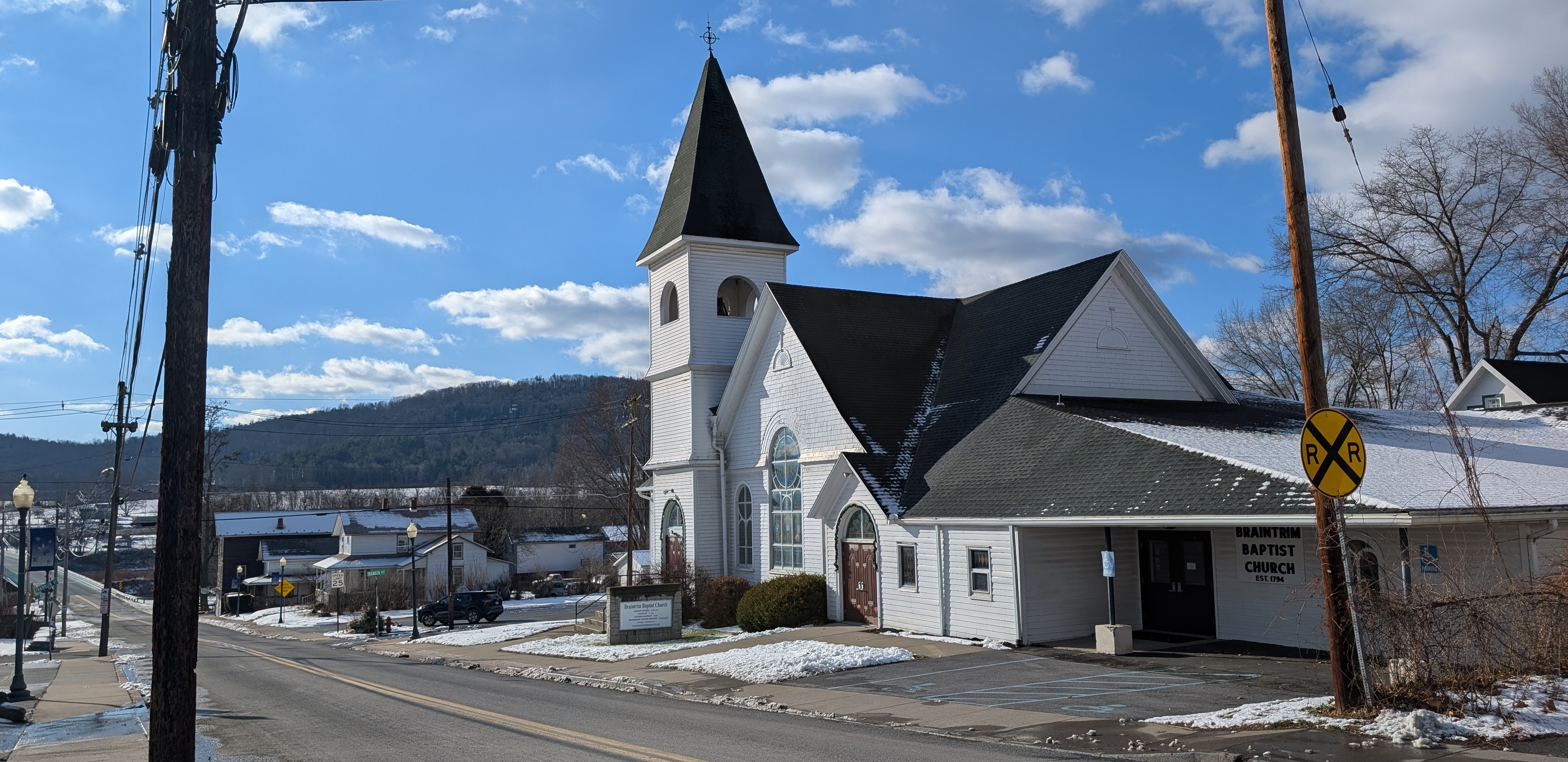
Braintrim Baptist Church Laceyville

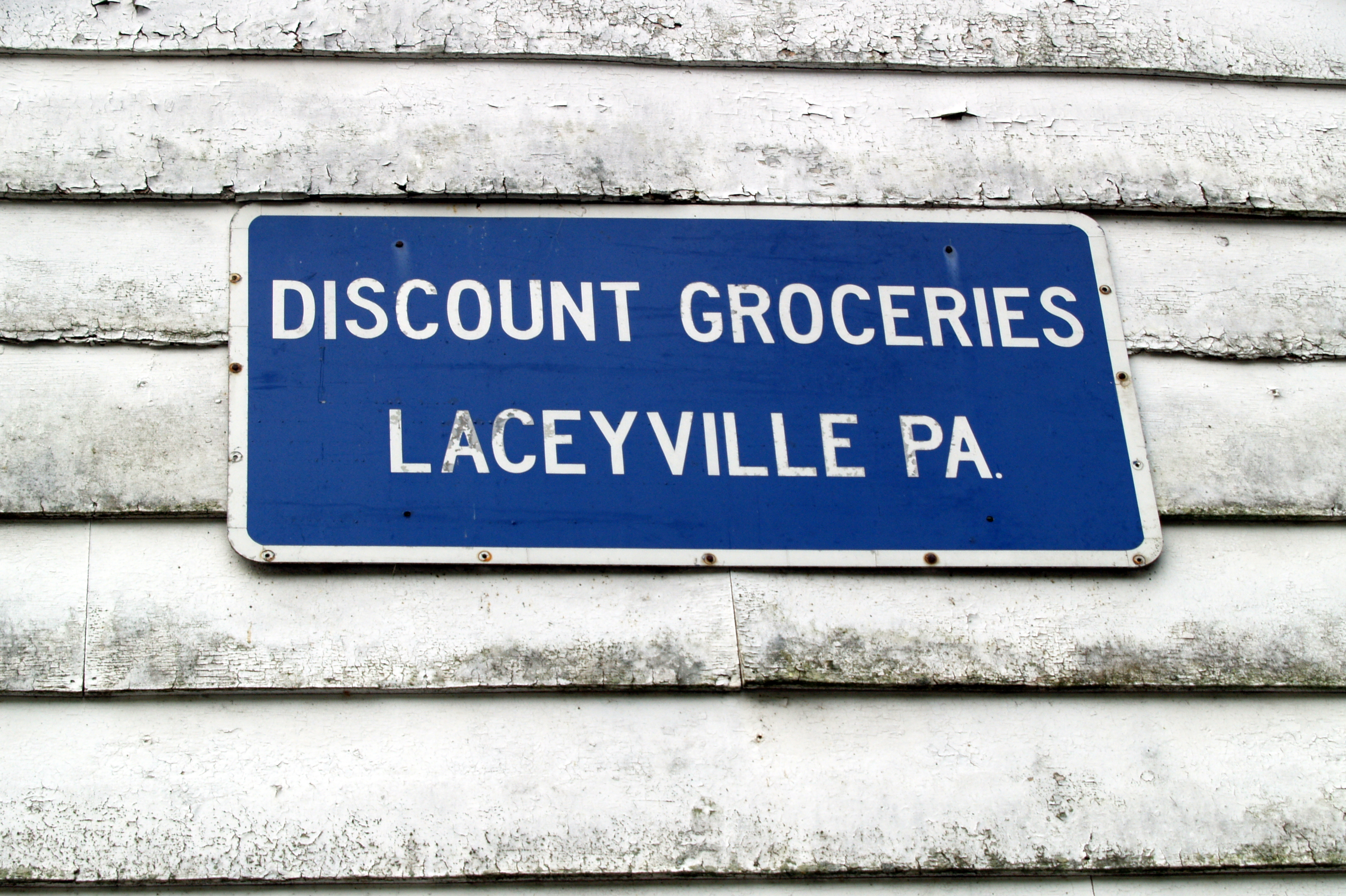
Abandoned grocery in Laceyville
