= Braintrim Township, Pennsylvania =

Township in Pennsylvania, US

- Township
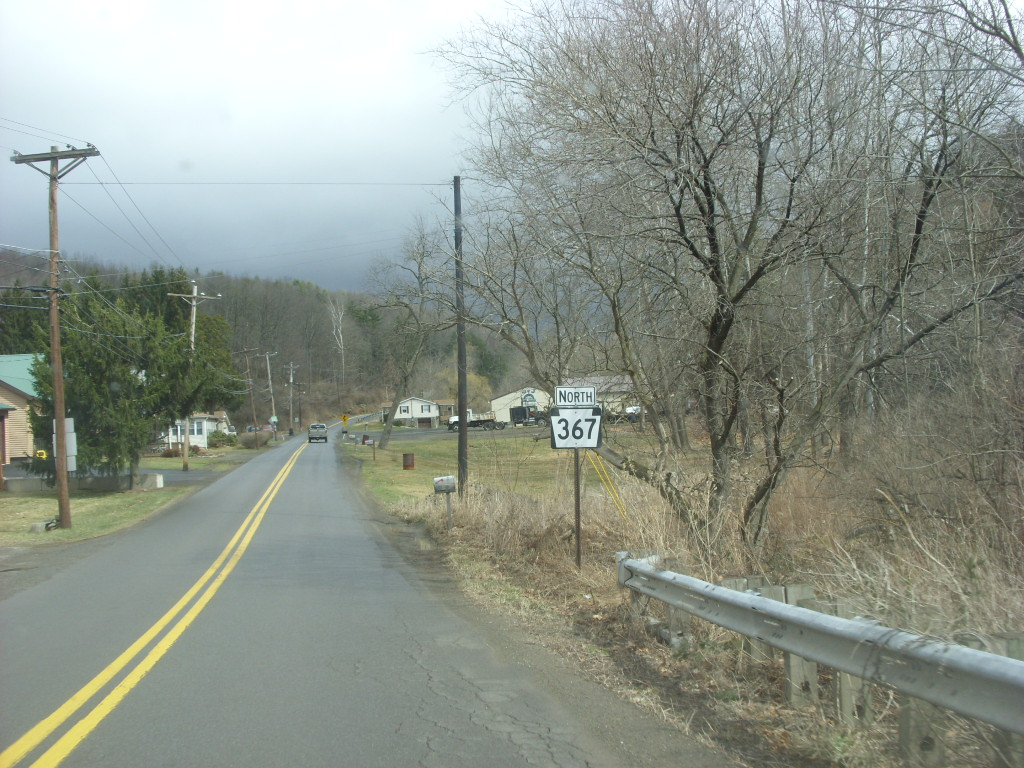
- PA 367 in Braintrim Township

- Location of Pennsylvania in the United States
- Coordinates: 41°38′30″N 76°07′59″W
- Country: United States
- State: Pennsylvania
- County: Wyoming

Area
  - Total: 6.17 sq mi (15.97 km^{2})
  - Land: 5.83 sq mi (15.10 km^{2})
  - Water: 0.34 sq mi (0.87 km^{2})
- Elevation: 1,135 ft (346 m)

Population (2020)
  - Total: 460 ▼
  - Estimate (2021): 460
  - Density: 84.2/sq mi (32.51/km^{2})
- Time zone: UTC-5 (EST)
  - Summer (DST): UTC-4 (EDT)
- Area code: 570
- FIPS code: 42-131-08176

Braintrim Township is a township in Wyoming County, Pennsylvania, United States. The population was 460 at the 2020 census.

== Geography ==
According to the United States Census Bureau, the territory of the township covers 6.1 square miles (16 km^{2}), of which a total of 5.8 square miles (15 km^{2}) is land and 0.3 square mile (0.9 km^{2}, or 4.92% of the total area), water.

== Demographics ==
Historical population
Census	Pop.	Note	%±
2010	502		—
2020	460		−8.4%
2021 (est.)	460		0.0%
U.S. Decennial Census

As of the census of 2010, there were 502 people, 208 households, and 137 families residing in the township. The population density was 86.6 inhabitants per square mile (33.4/km^{2}). There were 313 housing units at an average density of 54/sq mi (21.1/km^{2}). The racial makeup of the township was 99% White, 0.20% Asian, and 0.8% some other race. Hispanic or Latino of any race were 2.2% of the population.

There were 208 households, out of which 34.1% had children under the age of 18 living with them, 47.6% were married couples living together, 10.6% had a female householder with no husband present, and 34.1% were non-families. 25% of all households were made up of individuals, and 10.6% had someone living alone who was 65 years of age or older. The average household size was 2.41 and the average family size was 2.82.

In the township the population was spread out, with 24.3% under the age of 18, 62% from 18 to 64, and 13.7% who were 65 years of age or older. The median age was 36.4 years.

The median income for a household in the township was $44,750, and the median income for a family was $50,313. Males had a median income of $29,500 versus $23,750 for females. The per capita income for the township was $21,264. About 12.7% of families and 11.2% of the population were below the poverty line, including 23.2% of those under age 18 and none of those age 65 or over.
