= Tunkhannock, Pennsylvania =

Borough in Pennsylvania, US

Borough of Tunkhannock
- Borough
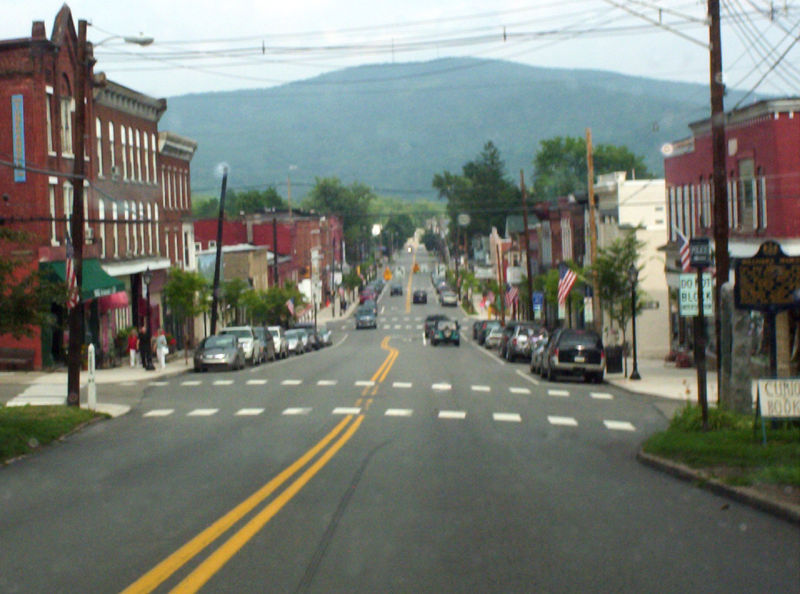
- Downtown Tunkhannock along U.S. Route 6, known locally as Tioga Street

- Location of Tunkhannock in Wyoming County, Pennsylvania

- Location of Tunkhannock in Pennsylvania Tunkhannock (the United States)
- Coordinates: 41°32′27″N 75°56′52″W
- Country: United States
- State: Pennsylvania
- County: Wyoming
- Founded: 1841

Government
  - Mayor: Stacy Huber

Area
  - Total: 0.95 sq mi (2.45 km^{2})
  - Land: 0.89 sq mi (2.30 km^{2})
  - Water: 0.054 sq mi (0.14 km^{2})
- Elevation: 692 ft (211 m)

Population (2020)
  - Total: 1,766 ▼
  - Estimate (2021): 1,759
  - Density: 1,909.5/sq mi (737.27/km^{2})
- Demonym: Tunkhaknuckle (Tunk-uh-nuckle)
- Time zone: UTC-5 (EST)
  - Summer (DST): UTC-4 (EDT)
- ZIP code: 18657
- Area code: 570
- FIPS code: 42-77784
- Website: Borough website

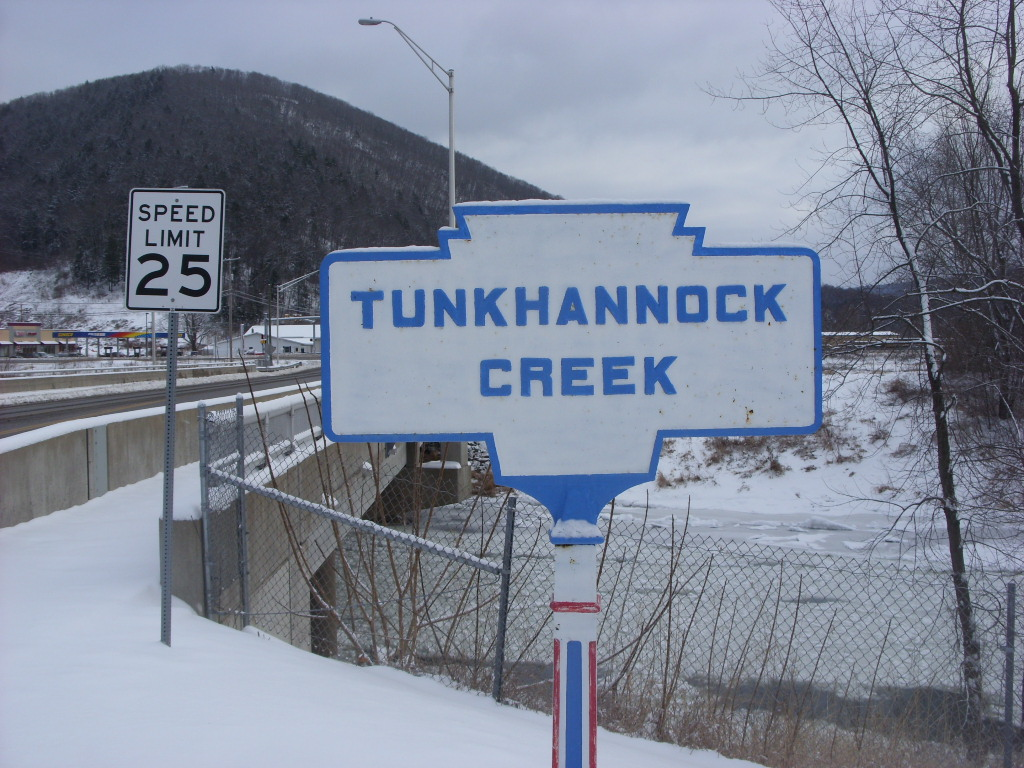
A Keystone Marker for Tunkhannock Creek in Tunkhannock

Tunkhannock (/təŋˈkænək/ tuhng-KA-nuhk) is a borough and county seat of Wyoming County, Pennsylvania, United States. Located 31 miles (50 km) northwest of Wilkes-Barre, Tunkhannock is in the Scranton–Wilkes-Barre–Hazleton, PA Metropolitan Statistical Area. In the past, lumbering was carried on extensively. Today, many residents are employed by the Procter & Gamble plant in nearby Washington Township. As of the 2020 census, the borough population was 1,766.

The name Tunkhannock is derived from the Minsi-Len'api term Ptuk'hanna'unk, which means "Bend-in-river-place", especially to the town's west, upstream at the radical bend called "The Neck". Modern Tunkhannock, Wyoming County, The Tunkhannock Historic District, bounded by Tioga, Pine, and Harrison Streets, and Wyoming Avenue, were added to the National Register of Historic Places in August 2005.

Tunkhannock is 17 miles (27 km) northwest of Scranton, 88 miles (142 km) northwest of Allentown and 141.7 miles (228.0 km) northwest of New York City.

== General information ==
- Area Code: 570 Exchanges: 836 and 996
- ZIP code: 18657
- Main streets/roads: Route 29 (Bridge Street), Business Route 6 (Tioga Street), Route 6 (Tunkhannock Bypass / Grand Army of the Republic Hwy), Route 92
- Voting Information: four wards (numbered 1,2,3,4); elected Borough Council

== Geography ==
Tunkhannock is located at 41°32′27″N 75°56′52″W (41.540836, -75.947703).

According to the U.S. Census Bureau, the borough has a total area of 0.9 square mile (2.3 km^{2}), all land.

== Transportation ==
Skyhaven Airport is a privately owned public use airport located one nautical mile (1.85 km) south of the central business district of Tunkhannock, in neighboring Eaton Township.

== Demographics ==
Historical population
Census	Pop.	Note	%±
1850	561		—
1860	638		13.7%
1870	953		49.4%
1880	1,116		17.1%
1890	1,253		12.3%
1900	1,305		4.2%
1910	1,598		22.5%
1920	1,736		8.6%
1930	1,973		13.7%
1940	2,161		9.5%
1950	2,170		0.4%
1960	2,297		5.9%
1970	2,251		−2.0%
1980	2,144		−4.8%
1990	2,251		5.0%
2000	1,911		−15.1%
2010	1,836		−3.9%
2020	1,767		−3.8%
2021 (est.)	1,759	▼	−0.5%

As of the census of 2010, there were 1,836 people, 817 households, and 447 families residing in the borough. The population density was 2,040 inhabitants per square mile (790/km^{2}). There were 871 housing units at an average density of 967.8 per square mile (373.7/km^{2}). The racial makeup of the borough was 95.9% White, 0.9% African American, 0.2% Native American, 1.1% Asian, 0.1% Pacific Islander, 0.35% from other races, and 1.45% from two or more races. 1.3% of the population were Hispanic or Latino of any race.

There were 817 households, out of which 25.3% had children under the age of 18 living with them, 38.7% were married couples living together, 12% had a female householder with no husband present, and 45.3% were non-families. 40.4% of all households were made up of individuals, and 20% had someone living alone who was 65 years of age or older. The average household size was 2.15 and the average family size was 2.92.

In the borough the population was spread out, with 22.3% under the age of 18, 57% from 18 to 64, and 20.7% who were 65 years of age or older. The median age was 43.5 years.

The median income for a household in the borough was $37,071, and the median income for a family was $56,250. Males had a median income of $43,098 versus $31,313 for females. The per capita income for the borough was $23,110. 2.4% of the population and 6.9% of families were below the poverty line. Out of the total population, none of those under the age of 18 and 8.6% of those 65 and older were living below the poverty line.

== Government ==
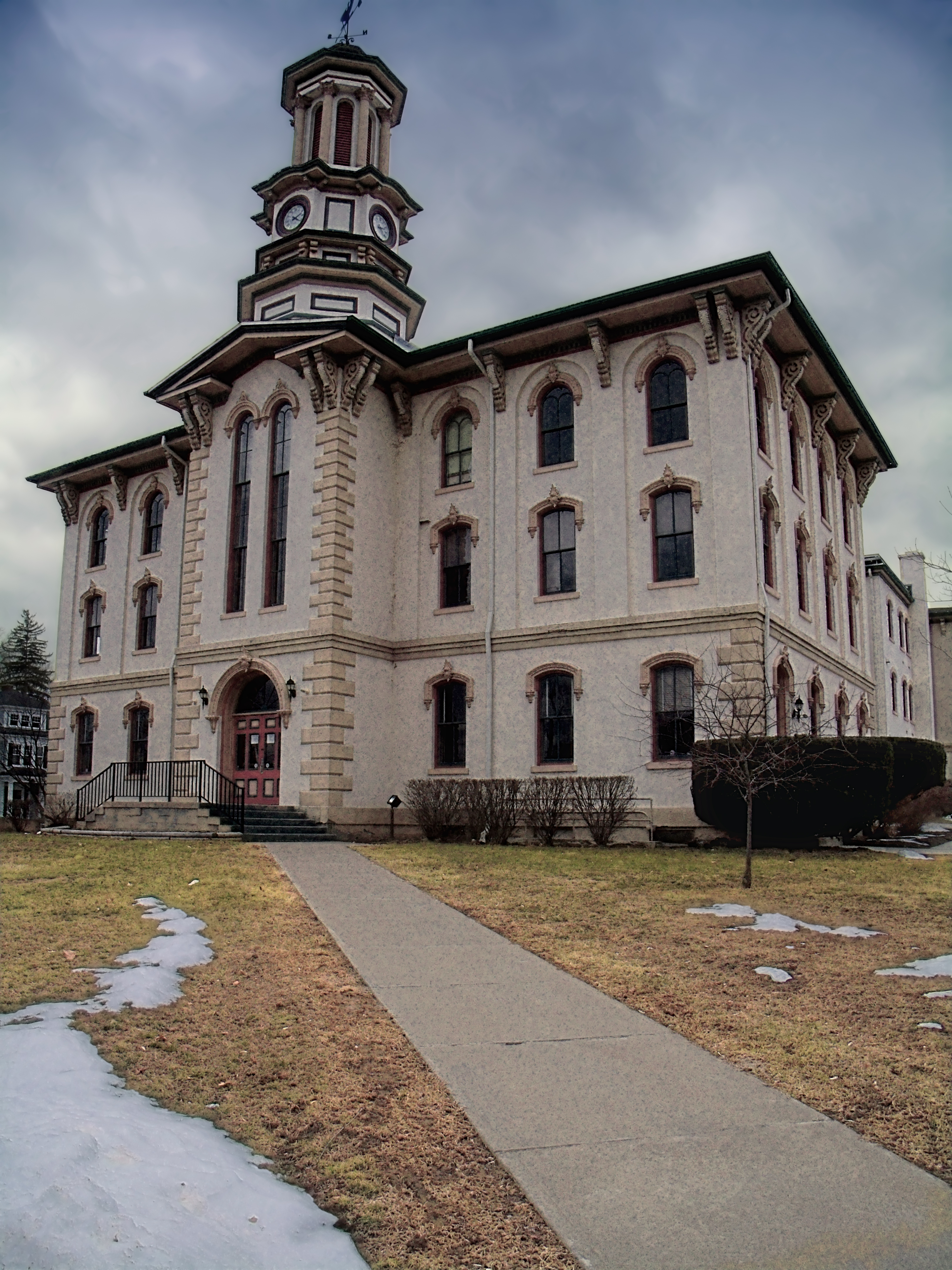
Wyoming County Courthouse

The borough is represented by a council–manager government.

=== Executive ===
Mayor	Stacy Huber	Republican

=== Council ===
Council Member	Party	Borough Ward
Ben Barzilowski	Democratic	2
Ron Coolbaugh	Republican	4
Dan Gay	Republican	1
David Wiggins	Republican	3
Robert K. Robinson	Republican	1
Lisa Tesluk	Republican	2
Ruth Vincenti	Republican	3
Mr. Meade	Democratic	4

== Education ==
It is in the Tunkhannock Area School District.

== Notable people ==
- John Brisbin – U.S. Congressman (1851)
- Frank Charles Bunnell – U.S. Congressman (1872–1873, 1885–1889)
- Charles E. Dietrich – U.S. Congressman (1935–1937)
- Joe Glenn – Major League Baseball player
- Robyn Griggs – American actress (1973–2022)
- Benjamin F. Harding – U.S. Senator from Oregon (1862–1865)
- Mike Hudock – professional football player
- Edwin J. Jorden – U.S. Congressman (1895)
- Mike Papi – professional baseball player (Cleveland Indians organization)
- Christopher Ries – Glass Sculptor
- Donald Sherwood – U.S. Congressman (1999–2007)
- Harold Rainsford Stark – U.S. Naval Admiral, Chief of Naval Operations 1939–1942 (1880–1972)
- Walter Tewksbury – 1900 Summer Olympics Gold Medalist
- Robert F. Wilner – Episcopalian Suffragan Bishop of the Philippines
