= Wyalusing Valley Junior-Senior High School =

Location
- RR 2 Box 7 Wyalusing, Pennsylvania 18853; United States
- Coordinates: 41°39′32″N 76°15′22″W

Information
- School type: Public, Junior and Senior high school
- School district: Wyalusing Area School District
- CEEB code: 395395
- Principal: Jackson T. Green
- Teaching staff: 36.30 (FTE) (2018–19)
- Grades: 7–12
- Enrollment: 588 (2018–19)
- Student to teacher ratio: 16.20:1 (2018–19)
- Color: Green Gold
- Mascot: Rams
- Yearbook: Vallian
- Website: www.wyalusingrams.com

The Wyalusing Valley Junior-Senior High School, commonly referred to as WVHS, is a Northeastern Pennsylvania public high school. The school is operated by the Wyalusing Area School District.

== Vocational opportunities ==
WVHS has access to a vocational school called Northern Tier Career Center (NTCC) in Towanda for students that wish to advance in a hands-on or technical career. This vocational education is available to students who are in 11th and 12th grades.

== Athletics ==
WVHS has many school-sponsored athletic activities, including football, wrestling, basketball, (girls only) soccer, baseball, softball, track and field, volleyball, golf and cross country. In addition, there are cheerleading squads for the football and basketball teams.

== Clubs ==
WVHS has many clubs meant to help the community or further learning outside of the classroom in a certain subject including: Yearbook, a computer club, FBLA, FHA, chorus, band, library club, orchestra, SADD, marching band, student council, ski club, Spanish club, Envirothon, Leo Club, Science Olympiad, and Youth and Government.
