= Northmoreland Township, Pennsylvania =

Township in Pennsylvania, US

Northmoreland Township
- Township
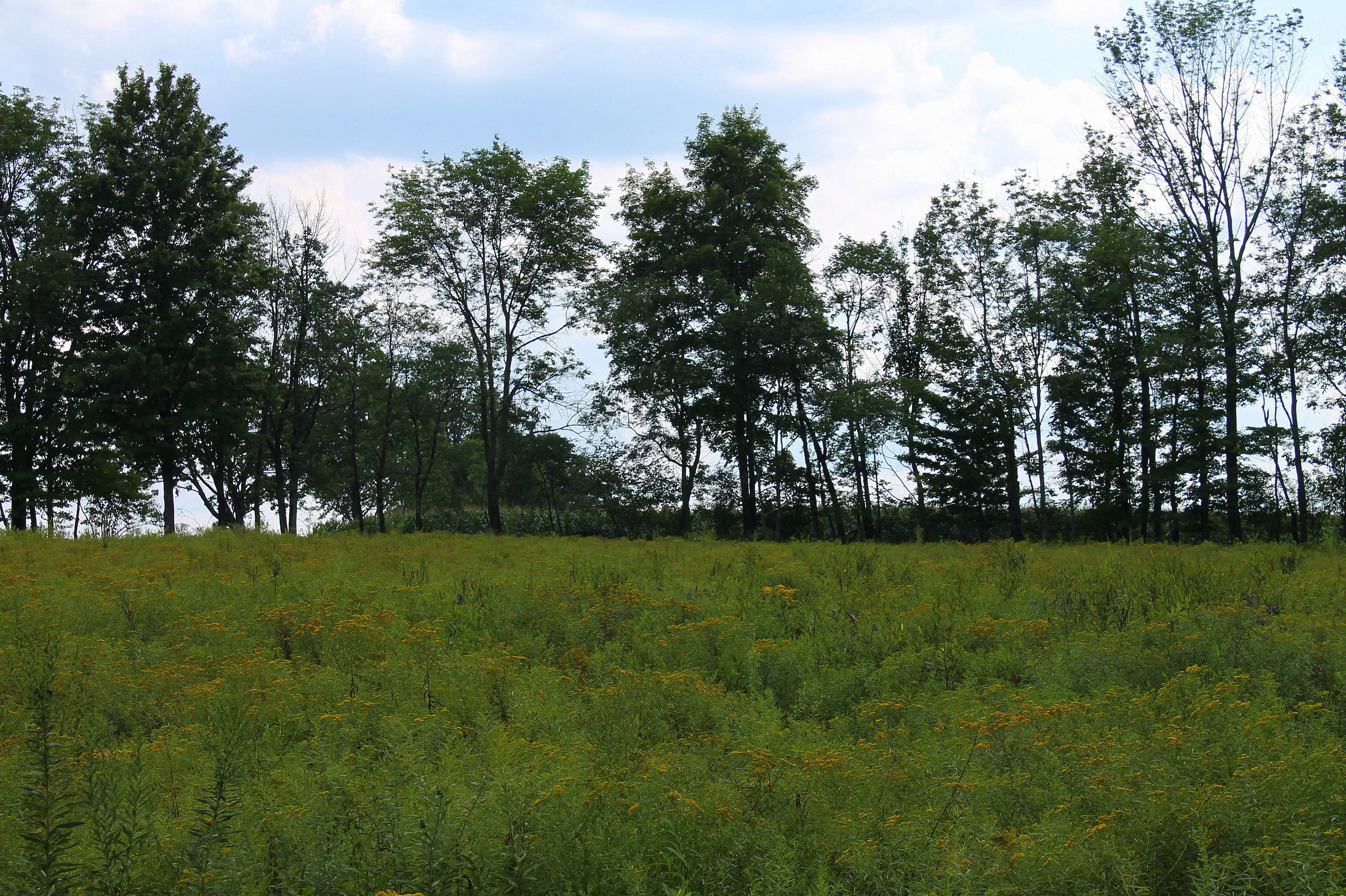
- Field and trees in Northmoreland Township

- Location of Pennsylvania in the United States
- Coordinates: 41°26′30″N 75°52′28″W
- Country: United States
- State: Pennsylvania
- County: Wyoming

Area
  - Total: 19.83 sq mi (51.36 km^{2})
  - Land: 19.66 sq mi (50.91 km^{2})
  - Water: 0.17 sq mi (0.45 km^{2})
- Elevation: 915 ft (279 m)

Population (2020)
  - Total: 1,408 ▼
  - Estimate (2021): 1,412
  - Density: 76.8/sq mi (29.64/km^{2})
- Time zone: UTC-5 (EST)
  - Summer (DST): UTC-4 (EDT)
- Area code: 570
- FIPS code: 42-131-55232

Northmoreland Township is a township in Wyoming County, Pennsylvania, United States. The population was 1,408 at the 2020 census.

== Geography ==
According to the United States Census Bureau, the township has a total area of 19.7 square miles (51 km^{2}), of which 19.5 square miles (51 km^{2}) is land and 0.1 square miles (0.26 km^{2}) (0.66%) is water.

== Demographics ==
Historical population
Census	Pop.	Note	%±
2010	1,558		—
2020	1,408		−9.6%
2021 (est.)	1,412		0.3%
U.S. Decennial Census

As of the census of 2000, there were 1,463 people, 540 households, and 422 families residing in the township. The population density was 74.9 inhabitants per square mile (28.9/km^{2}). There were 600 housing units at an average density of 30.7 units per square mile (11.9 units/km^{2}). The racial makeup of the township was 99.66% White, 0.21% African American, 0.07% Asian, and 0.07% from two or more races. Hispanic or Latino of any race were 0.41% of the population.

There were 540 households, out of which 36.9% had children under the age of 18 living with them, 68.0% were married couples living together, 6.3% had a female householder with no husband present, and 21.7% were non-families. 17.8% of all households were made up of individuals, and 8.0% had someone living alone who was 65 years of age or older. The average household size was 2.71 and the average family size was 3.07.

In the township the population was spread out, with 26.5% under the age of 18, 5.9% from 18 to 24, 30.7% from 25 to 44, 27.8% from 45 to 64, and 9.0% who were 65 years of age or older. The median age was 37 years. For every 100 females there were 109.0 males. For every 100 females age 18 and over, there were 103.2 males.

The median income for a household in the township was $42,692, and the median income for a family was $48,833. Males had a median income of $34,028 versus $23,036 for females. The per capita income for the township was $17,571. About 6.5% of families and 7.4% of the population were below the poverty line, including 6.4% of those under age 18 and 15.3% of those age 65 or over.
