= HMS Exeter =

Five ships of the Royal Navy have been named HMS Exeter after the city of Exeter in Devon.

- HMS Exeter (1680) was a 70-gun third rate launched in 1680. She was damaged in an explosion in 1691 and was hulked. She was broken up in 1717.
- HMS Exeter (1697) was a 60-gun fourth rate launched in 1697. She was rebuilt to carry 58 guns in 1744 and was broken up in 1763.
- HMS Exeter (1763) was a 64-gun third rate launched in 1763. She was burned as unseaworthy in 1784.
- HMS Exeter (68) was a York-class heavy cruiser launched in 1929. She fought at the River Plate in 1939, and was sunk during the Second Battle of the Java Sea on 1 March 1942.
- HMS Exeter was planned as a Type 61 frigate. She was ordered in 1956, but cancelled in 1957.
- HMS Exeter (D89) was a Type 42 destroyer, launched in 1979. She served in the Falklands War and the Gulf War, and was in service until she was decommissioned on 27 May 2009.

== Battle honours ==
- Sadras, 1782
- Providien, 1782
- Negapatam, 1782
- Trincomalee, 1782
- River Plate, 1939
- Malaya, 1942
- Sunda Strait, 1942
- Falklands, 1982
- Kuwait, 1991
