= Eaton Township, Wyoming County, Pennsylvania =

Township in Pennsylvania, US

Eaton Township
- Township
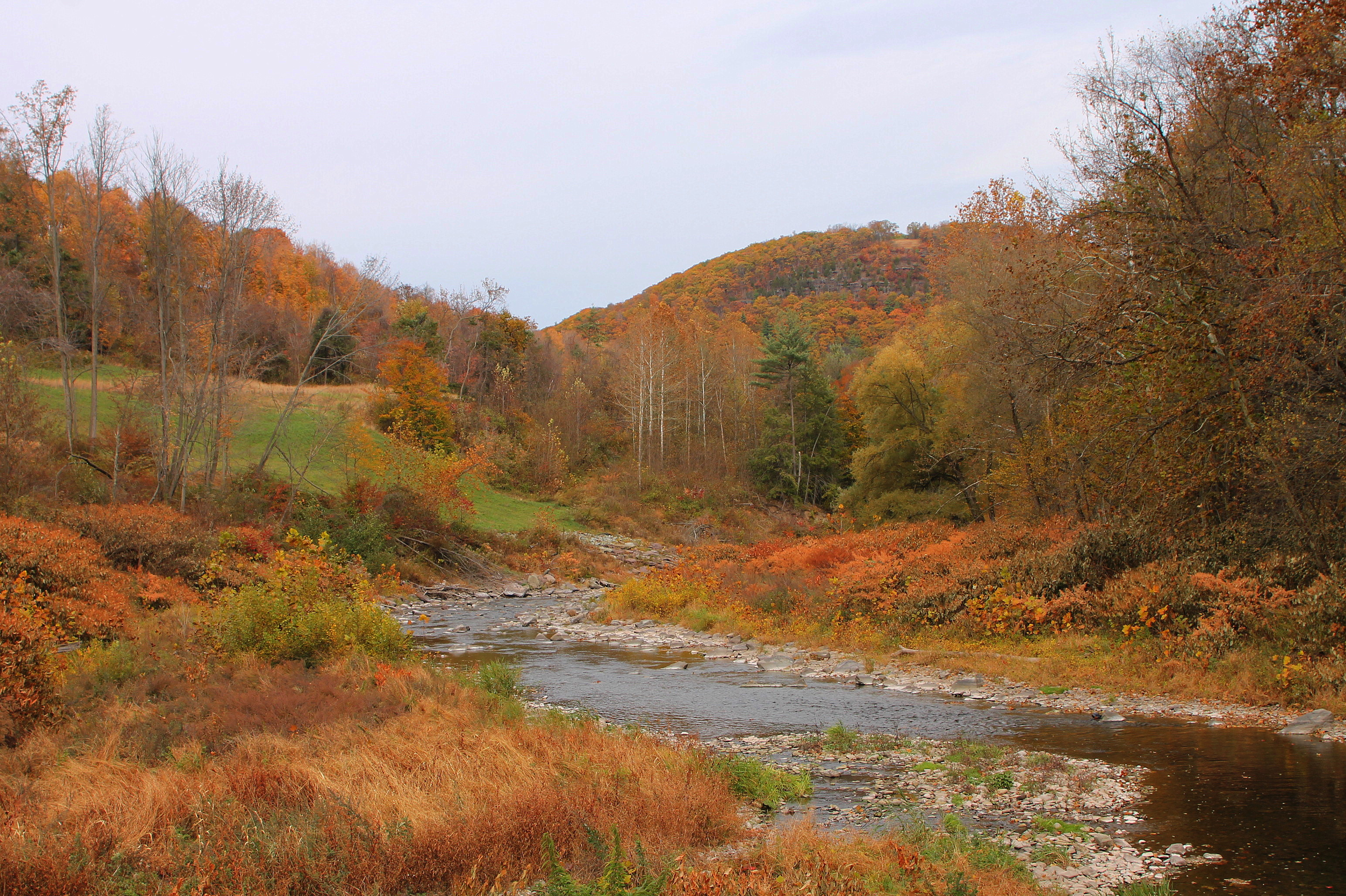
- Bowman Creek in Eaton Township

- Location of PA in the United States
- Coordinates: 41°29′00″N 76°01′59″W
- Country: United States
- State: Pennsylvania
- County: Wyoming

Area
  - Total: 37.13 sq mi (96.16 km^{2})
  - Land: 35.99 sq mi (93.22 km^{2})
  - Water: 1.14 sq mi (2.95 km^{2})
- Elevation: 1,804 ft (550 m)

Population (2020)
  - Total: 1,438 ▼
  - Estimate (2021): 1,435
  - Density: 41.6/sq mi (16.06/km^{2})
- Time zone: UTC-5 (EST)
  - Summer (DST): UTC-4 (EDT)
- ZIP Code: 18657
- Area code: 570
- Website: eatontwp.com

Eaton Township is a township in Wyoming County, Pennsylvania, United States. The population was 1,438 at the 2020 census.

== Geography ==
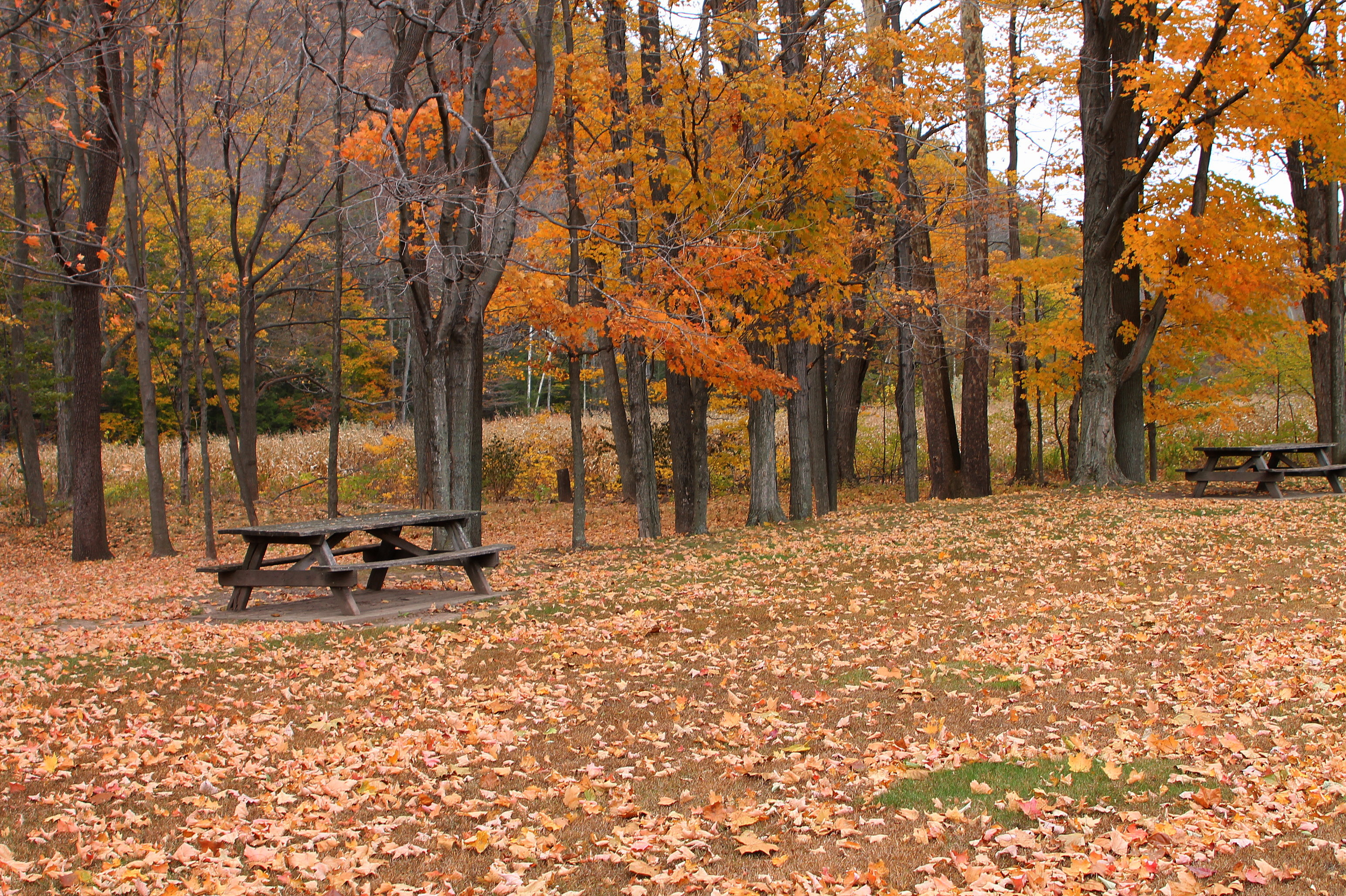
Rest stop on Pennsylvania Route 29 in Eaton Township

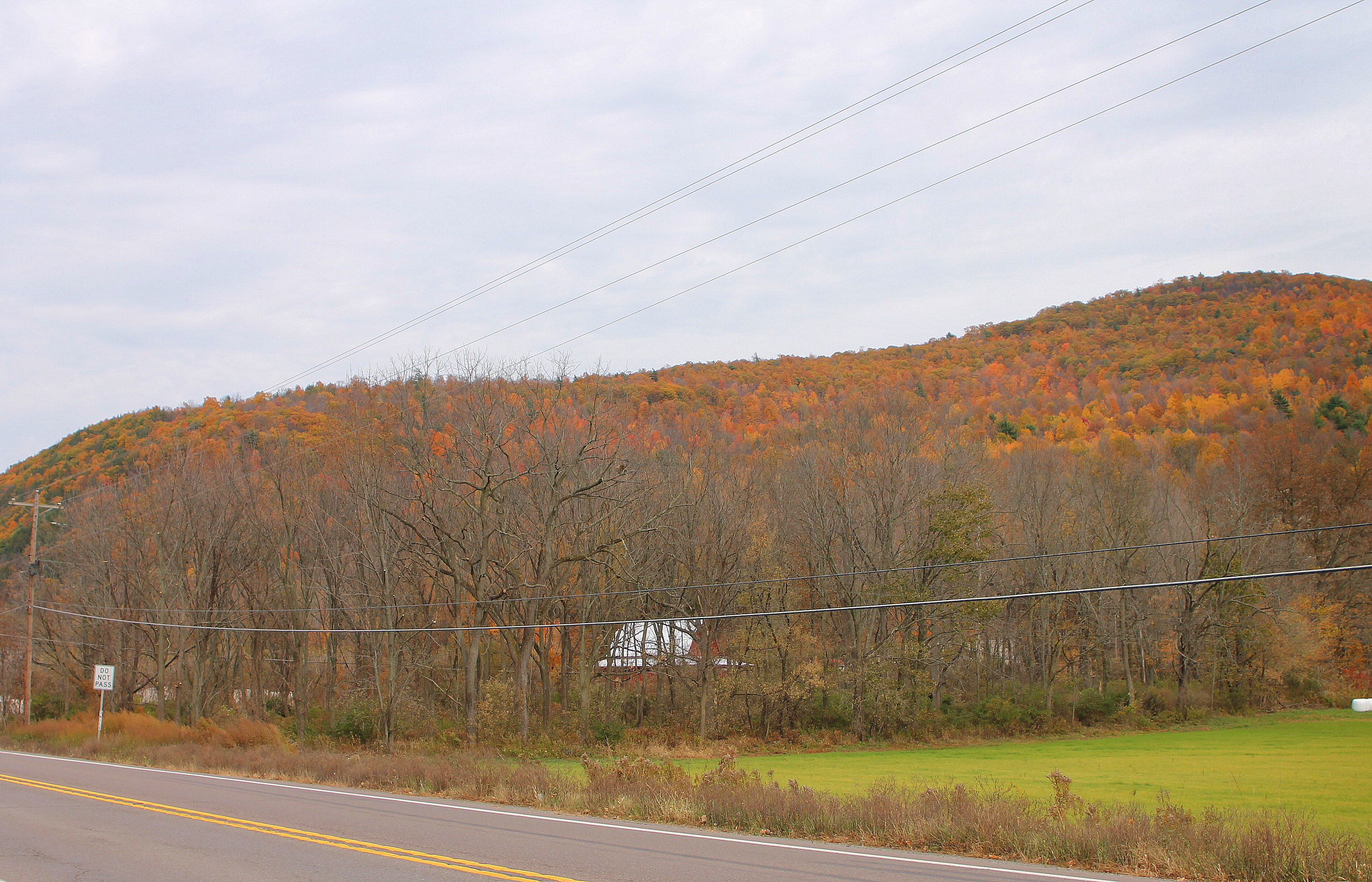
Miller Mountain in Eaton Township, Wyoming County, Pennsylvania

According to the United States Census Bureau, the township has a total area of 37.1 square miles (96 km^{2}), of which 36 square miles (93 km^{2}) is land and 1.1 square miles (2.8 km^{2}) (2.96%) is water.

== Mass shooting ==
In the early hours on the morning of June 8, 2017, employees at a Weis Markets supermarket in Eaton Township, Pennsylvania, United States, were stocking and closing the store for the night. Shortly before 1:00 a.m., 24-year-old Randy Stair barricaded the exits of the store and proceeded to shoot and kill three of his co-workers before fatally shooting himself.

== Demographics ==
Historical population
Census	Pop.	Note	%±
2010	1,519		—
2020	1,438		−5.3%
2021 (est.)	1,435		−0.2%
U.S. Decennial Census

As of the census of 2010, there were 1,519 people, 630 households, and 437 families residing in the township. The population density was 42.2 inhabitants per square mile (16.3/km^{2}). There were 774 housing units at an average density of 21.5/sq mi (8.4/km^{2}). The racial makeup of the township was 98% White, 0.6% African American, 0.2% Native American, 0.3% Asian, 0.1% from other races, and 0.7% from two or more races. Hispanic or Latino of any race were 0.3% of the population.

There were 630 households, out of which 26.3% had children under the age of 18 living with them, 55.6% were married couples living together, 8.4% had a female householder with no husband present, and 30.6% were non-families. 26.2% of all households were made up of individuals, and 13.3% had someone living alone who was 65 years of age or older. The average household size was 2.40 and the average family size was 2.82.

In the township the population was spread out, with 19% under the age of 18, 59.6% from 18 to 64, and 21.4% who were 65 years of age or older. The median age was 47.3 years.

The median income for a household in the township was $51,500, and the median income for a family was $65,547. Males had a median income of $35,781 versus $27,727 for females. The per capita income for the township was $24,354. About 7.8% of families and 10.5% of the population were below the poverty line, including 20.2% of those under age 18 and 12.3% of those age 65 or over.
