= Wyoming County, Pennsylvania =

County in Pennsylvania, United States

- County
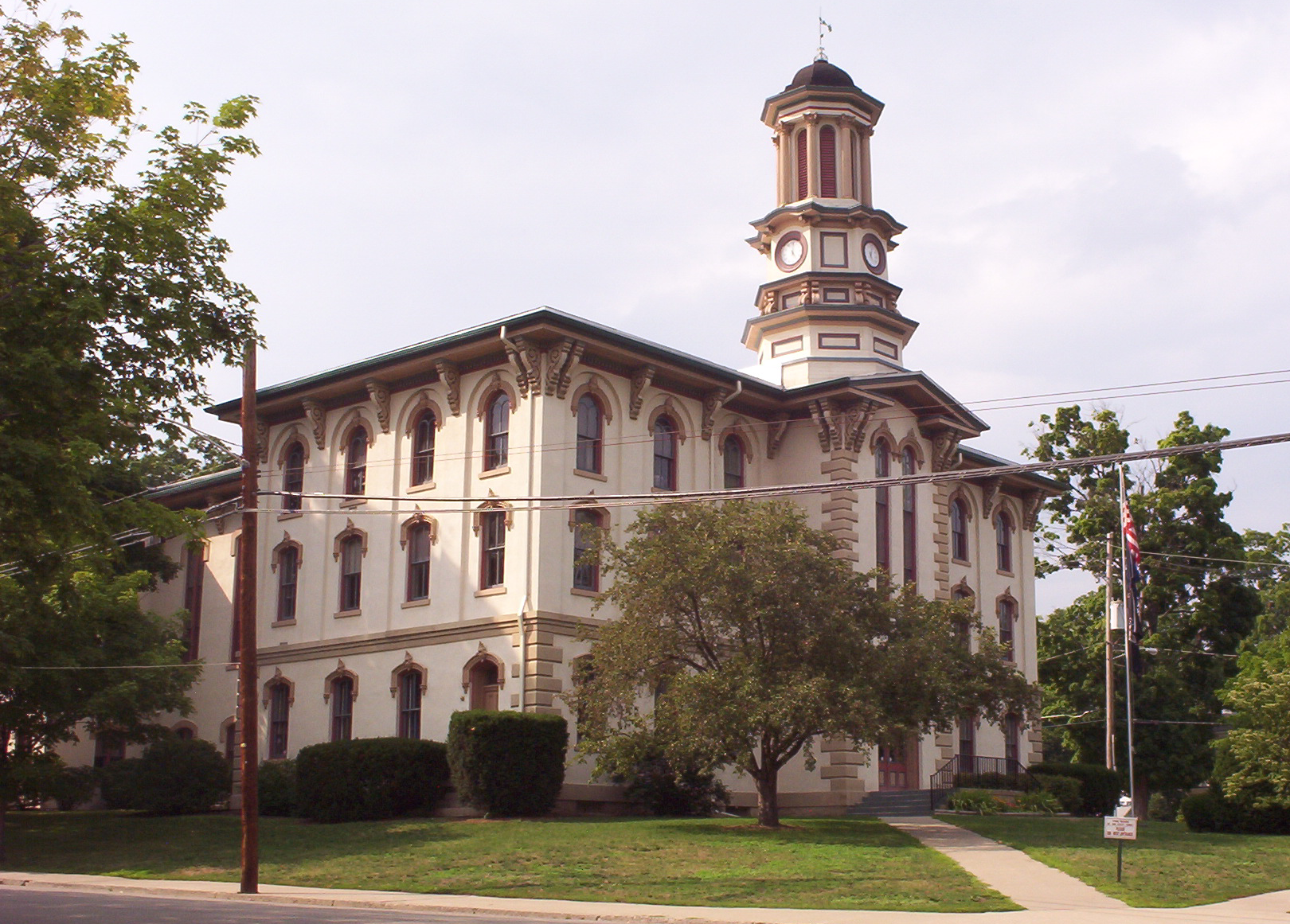
- The Wyoming County Courthouse in Tunkhannock

- Logo

- Location within the U.S. state of Pennsylvania
- Coordinates: 41°31′N 76°01′W
- Country: United States
- State: Pennsylvania
- Founded: April 4, 1842
- Named for: Wyoming Valley
- Seat: Tunkhannock
- Largest borough: Tunkhannock

Area
  - Total: 405 sq mi (1,050 km^{2})
  - Land: 397 sq mi (1,030 km^{2})
  - Water: 7.7 sq mi (20 km^{2}) 1.9%

Population (2020)
  - Total: 26,069
  - Estimate (2025): 25,790 ▼
  - Density: 65.7/sq mi (25.4/km^{2})
- Time zone: UTC−5 (Eastern)
  - Summer (DST): UTC−4 (EDT)
- Congressional district: 9th
- Website: wyomingcountypa.gov

Wyoming County is a county in the Commonwealth of Pennsylvania. As of the 2020 census, the population was 26,069. Its county seat is Tunkhannock. It was created in 1842 from part of Luzerne County. The county is part of the Northeast Pennsylvania region of the state. (Note: Includes Luzerne, Lackawanna, Monroe, Schuylkill, Carbon, Pike, Bradford, Wayne, Susquehanna, Wyoming and Sullivan Counties)

Wyoming County is included in the Scranton—Wilkes-Barre—Hazleton, PA Metropolitan Statistical Area.

== Geography ==
According to the U.S. Census Bureau, the county has a total area of 405 square miles (1,050 km^{2}), of which 397 square miles (1,030 km^{2}) is land and 7.7 square miles (20 km^{2}) (1.9%) is water. The county is intersected by the North Branch of the Susquehanna River, and drained by Tunkhannock, Mehoopany, and other large creeks. The land surface is generally hilly or mountainous, Mehoopany, Tunkhannock, Knob, and Bowman's mountains occupying a portion. The soil is fertile. Timber, coal, and iron are very abundant.

=== Climate ===
The county has a humid continental climate which is warm-summer (Dfb) except along the river starting below Falls where it is hot-summer (Dfa). Average monthly temperatures in Tunkhannock range from 25.2 °F in January to 70.9 °F in July.

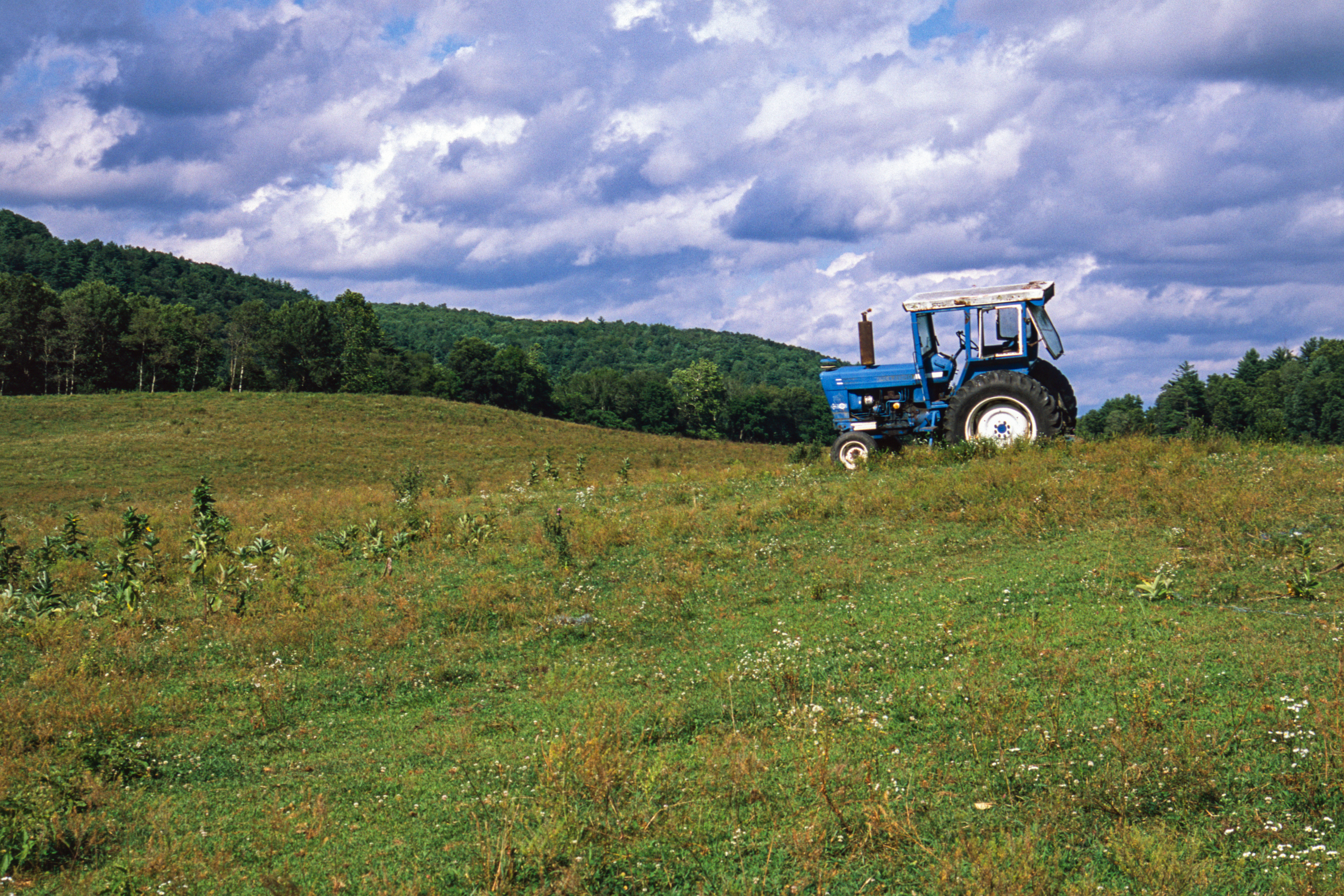
Idle tractor sitting in a field near Tunkhannock Viaduct

=== Adjacent counties ===
- Susquehanna County (north)
- Lackawanna County (east)
- Luzerne County (south)
- Sullivan County (west)
- Bradford County (northwest)

=== Major roads ===
- US 6
- US 11
- PA 29
- PA 87
- PA 92
- PA 107
- PA 187
- PA 267
- PA 292
- PA 307
- PA 309
- PA 367

== Demographics ==
Historical population
Census	Pop.	Note	%±
1850	10,655		—
1860	12,540		17.7%
1870	14,585		16.3%
1880	15,598		6.9%
1890	15,891		1.9%
1900	17,152		7.9%
1910	15,509		−9.6%
1920	14,101		−9.1%
1930	15,517		10.0%
1940	16,702		7.6%
1950	16,766		0.4%
1960	16,813		0.3%
1970	19,082		13.5%
1980	26,433		38.5%
1990	28,076		6.2%
2000	28,080		0.0%
2010	28,276		0.7%
2020	26,069		−7.8%
2025 (est.)	25,790	▼	−1.1%
U.S. Decennial Census; 1790-1960 1900-1990; 1990-2000 2010-2017 2010-2020

=== Racial and ethnic composition ===
Wyoming County, Pennsylvania – Racial and ethnic composition Note: the US Census treats Hispanic/Latino as an ethnic category. This table excludes Latinos from the racial categories and assigns them to a separate category. Hispanics/Latinos may be of any race.
Race / Ethnicity (NH = Non-Hispanic)	Pop 1980	Pop 1990	Pop 2000	Pop 2010	Pop 2020	% 1980	% 1990	% 2000	% 2010	% 2020
White alone (NH)	26,198	27,691	27,473	27,270	24,142	99.11%	98.63%	97.84%	96.44%	92.61%
Black or African American alone (NH)	71	133	137	185	214	0.27%	0.47%	0.49%	0.65%	0.82%
Native American or Alaska Native alone (NH)	6	25	46	51	32	0.02%	0.09%	0.16%	0.18%	0.12%
Asian alone (NH)	38	81	77	94	115	0.14%	0.29%	0.27%	0.33%	0.44%
Native Hawaiian or Pacific Islander alone (NH)	x	x	2	3	3	x	x	0.01%	0.01%	0.01%
Other race alone (NH)	20	11	12	7	40	0.08%	0.04%	0.04%	0.02%	0.15%
Mixed race or Multiracial (NH)	x	x	146	229	942	x	x	0.52%	0.81%	3.61%
Hispanic or Latino (any race)	100	135	187	437	581	0.38%	0.48%	0.67%	1.55%	2.23%
Total	26,433	28,076	28,080	28,276	26,069	100.00%	100.00%	100.00%	100.00%	100.00%

=== 2020 census ===
As of the 2020 census, the county had a population of 26,069. The median age was 45.4 years. 19.2% of residents were under the age of 18 and 21.8% of residents were 65 years of age or older. For every 100 females there were 100.4 males, and for every 100 females age 18 and over there were 99.0 males age 18 and over.

The racial makeup of the county was 93.5% White, 0.9% Black or African American, 0.2% American Indian and Alaska Native, 0.5% Asian, <0.1% Native Hawaiian and Pacific Islander, 0.6% from some other race, and 4.4% from two or more races. Hispanic or Latino residents of any race comprised 2.2% of the population.

4.7% of residents lived in urban areas, while 95.3% lived in rural areas.

There were 10,698 households in the county, of which 25.6% had children under the age of 18 living in them. Of all households, 49.0% were married-couple households, 19.3% were households with a male householder and no spouse or partner present, and 23.1% were households with a female householder and no spouse or partner present. About 28.2% of all households were made up of individuals and 13.7% had someone living alone who was 65 years of age or older.

There were 12,819 housing units, of which 16.5% were vacant. Among occupied housing units, 75.9% were owner-occupied and 24.1% were renter-occupied. The homeowner vacancy rate was 1.4% and the rental vacancy rate was 7.7%.

=== 2000 census ===
As of the 2000 census, there were 28,080 people, 10,762 households, and 7,705 families residing in the county. The population density was 71 people per square mile (27 people/km^{2}). There were 12,713 housing units at an average density of 32 per square mile (12/km^{2}). The racial makeup of the county was 98.28% White, 0.53% Black or African American, 0.27% Asian, 0.17% Native American, 0.01% Pacific Islander, 0.15% from other races, and 0.59% from two or more races. 0.67% of the population were Hispanic or Latino of any race. 20.3% were of German, 12.9% Irish, 11.9% English, 11.6% Polish, 9.6% American and 8.1% Italian ancestry.

There were 10,762 households, out of which 33.20% had children under the age of 18 living with them, 58.10% were married couples living together, 9.30% had a female householder with no husband present, and 28.40% were non-families. 24.10% of all households were made up of individuals, and 9.90% had someone living alone who was 65 years of age or older. The average household size was 2.55 and the average family size was 3.02. In the county, the population was spread out, with 25.50% under the age of 18, 8.00% from 18 to 24, 28.10% from 25 to 44, 25.20% from 45 to 64, and 13.20% who were 65 years of age or older. The median age was 38 years. For every 100 females there were 98.60 males. For every 100 females age 18 and over, there were 95.80 males.

== Politics ==
United States presidential election results for Wyoming County, Pennsylvania
Year	Republican		Democratic		Third party(ies)	
Year	No.	%	No.	%	No.	%
1888	2,026	50.70%	1,841	46.07%	129	3.23%
1892	2,029	49.82%	1,905	46.77%	139	3.41%
1896	2,373	53.24%	1,951	43.77%	133	2.98%
1900	2,247	52.61%	1,875	43.90%	149	3.49%
1904	2,308	56.90%	1,575	38.83%	173	4.27%
1908	2,234	55.79%	1,629	40.68%	141	3.52%
1912	480	13.59%	1,505	42.60%	1,548	43.82%
1916	1,698	52.12%	1,444	44.32%	116	3.56%
1920	3,208	68.43%	1,247	26.60%	233	4.97%
1924	3,213	68.06%	1,194	25.29%	314	6.65%
1928	5,321	85.00%	906	14.47%	33	0.53%
1932	3,968	58.00%	2,728	39.88%	145	2.12%
1936	5,321	61.25%	3,269	37.63%	97	1.12%
1940	5,273	67.14%	2,548	32.44%	33	0.42%
1944	4,581	69.60%	1,982	30.11%	19	0.29%
1948	4,332	70.70%	1,674	27.32%	121	1.97%
1952	5,772	75.72%	1,815	23.81%	36	0.47%
1956	5,906	73.56%	2,120	26.40%	3	0.04%
1960	6,188	69.36%	2,726	30.56%	7	0.08%
1964	3,864	47.45%	4,268	52.41%	12	0.15%
1968	5,207	64.09%	2,366	29.12%	551	6.78%
1972	6,423	74.42%	2,112	24.47%	96	1.11%
1976	5,705	60.34%	3,628	38.37%	122	1.29%
1980	5,919	64.57%	2,766	30.17%	482	5.26%
1984	7,230	74.01%	2,518	25.78%	21	0.21%
1988	6,607	69.94%	2,797	29.61%	43	0.46%
1992	5,143	47.40%	3,158	29.11%	2,549	23.49%
1996	4,888	46.96%	4,049	38.90%	1,471	14.13%
2000	6,922	59.12%	4,363	37.26%	424	3.62%
2004	7,782	60.65%	4,982	38.82%	68	0.53%
2008	6,983	52.81%	5,985	45.26%	255	1.93%
2012	6,587	55.26%	5,061	42.45%	273	2.29%
2016	8,837	66.63%	3,811	28.74%	614	4.63%
2020	9,936	66.68%	4,704	31.57%	260	1.74%
2024	10,222	67.72%	4,680	31.00%	193	1.28%

United States Senate election results for Wyoming County, Pennsylvania1
Year	Republican		Democratic		Third party(ies)	
Year	No.	%	No.	%	No.	%
1994	5,175	61.18%	2,970	35.11%	314	3.71%
2000	7,856	68.55%	3,356	29.28%	249	2.17%
2006	5,635	55.10%	4,591	44.90%	0	0.00%
2012	6,391	54.08%	5,117	43.30%	310	2.62%
2018	6,582	61.93%	3,868	36.39%	178	1.67%
2024	9,919	66.04%	4,750	31.63%	350	2.33%

United States Senate election results for Wyoming County, Pennsylvania3
Year	Republican		Democratic		Third party(ies)	
Year	No.	%	No.	%	No.	%
1992	5,805	54.14%	4,154	38.74%	763	7.12%
1998	7,166	77.53%	1,810	19.58%	267	2.89%
2004	8,336	66.61%	3,265	26.09%	913	7.30%
2010	5,569	62.91%	3,283	37.09%	0	0.00%
2016	7,844	60.03%	4,154	31.79%	1,068	8.17%
2022	7,338	62.30%	4,059	34.46%	382	3.24%

Pennsylvania Gubernatorial election results for Wyoming County
Year	Republican		Democratic		Third party(ies)	
Year	No.	%	No.	%	No.	%
1970	4,279	61.53%	2,460	35.38%	215	3.09%
1974	4,817	65.52%	2,476	33.68%	59	0.80%
1978	5,389	71.50%	2,108	27.97%	40	0.53%
1982	4,737	62.14%	2,851	37.40%	35	0.46%
1986	4,002	52.35%	3,583	46.87%	59	0.77%
1990	1,969	30.75%	4,434	69.25%	0	0.00%
1994	5,074	59.56%	2,481	29.12%	964	11.32%
1998	6,965	74.54%	1,682	18.00%	697	7.46%
2002	5,152	61.92%	2,938	35.31%	231	2.78%
2006	4,726	46.13%	5,518	53.87%	0	0.00%
2010	5,901	66.17%	3,017	33.83%	0	0.00%
2014	4,381	55.65%	3,491	44.35%	0	0.00%
2018	6,344	59.57%	4,101	38.51%	204	1.92%
2022	6,966	59.15%	4,519	38.37%	292	2.48%

As of May 15, 2023, there were 17,361 registered voters in Wyoming County.

- Republican: 10,561 (60.83%)
- Democratic: 4,807 (27.69%)
- No party affiliation: 1,304 (7.51%)
- Other parties: 689 (3.97%)
Chart of Voter Registration
1. Republican (60.8%)
2. Democratic (27.7%)
3. Independent (7.51%)
4. Other Parties (3.97%)

=== County commissioners ===
- Richard Wilbur, Chair, Republican
- Thomas Henry, Vice-chair, Republican
- Ernest King, Democrat

=== Law enforcement ===
As of 2016 all areas in the county use the Pennsylvania State Police (PSP) in a law enforcement capacity, either with part-time police departments or with no other police departments.

=== Other county offices ===
- Auditors:
  - Laura Dickson, Democrat
  - Ashley Ritz Darby, Republican
  - Judy Shupp, Republican
- District Attorney, Joe Peters, Republican
- Prothonotary, Cindy Adams, Republican
- Register of Wills & Recorder of Deeds, Dennis Montross, Republican
- Sheriff, Robert Roberts, Republican
- Treasurer, Patricia Mead, Republican

=== State representative ===
- Jamie Walsh, Republican, 117th district

=== State senator ===
- Lisa Baker, Republican, 20th district

=== United States House of Representatives ===
- Dan Meuser, Republican, Pennsylvania's 9th congressional district

=== United States Senator ===
- Dave McCormick, Republican
- John Fetterman, Democrat

== Education ==
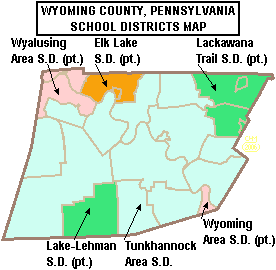
Map of Wyoming County, Pennsylvania School Districts

=== Public school districts ===
School districts include:

- Elk Lake School District (also in Susquehanna County)
- Lackawanna Trail School District (also in Lackawanna County)
- Lake-Lehman School District (also in Luzerne County)
- Tunkhannock Area School District
- Wyalusing Area School District (also in Bradford County)
- Wyoming Area School District (also in Luzerne County)

=== Higher education ===
- Keystone College (also in Lackawanna County)

== Transportation ==
Skyhaven Airport is a public use airport located in Wyoming County, one nautical mile (1.85 km) south of the central business district of Tunkhannock.

With the town sited on the lower end of the upper third of the Susquehanna, busily wending its way south to the Chesapeake Bay, the river banks to either side the whole length of the Susquehanna were historically used as a rail transport corridor with competing railroads typically making their way on either side on the important NYC and Philadelphia to Buffalo, New York routes connecting the eastern seaboard to cities such as Chicago on the Great Lakes; towns like Tunkhannock played an important role in the highly competitive stakes for such high profit passenger expresses for steam locomotives had surprisingly short cruising ranges and passenger travel had higher earnings than freight. Today, except for select parts, the river bank rail transport infrastructures remaining are mainly left bank located assets of a single railroad's operations department, even shared roads (operated over by several lines) these days use the single corridor along the east/left river bank connecting the large Sayre Yard on the stateline in Sayre, Pennsylvania further upriver to the transitional Duryea yard. After the collapse of Conrail, trackage on the Northern Susquehanna is operated by Norfolk Southern, with some areas sublet to other road companies. The trackage running through Tunkhannock

Pennsylvania Route 29, a continuation of PA-309 from Philadelphia and Allentown, connects to the New York state line providing north–south road connections by secondary highway while PA-92, and especially U.S. Route 6, provide major east–west secondary highway access to the region.

== Communities ==
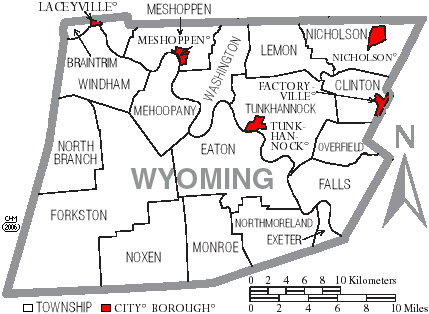
Map of Wyoming County, Pennsylvania with Municipal Labels showing Boroughs (red) and Townships (white).

Under Pennsylvania law, there are four types of incorporated municipalities: cities, boroughs, townships, and, in at most two cases, towns. The following boroughs and townships are located in Wyoming County:

=== Boroughs ===
- Factoryville
- Laceyville
- Meshoppen
- Nicholson
- Tunkhannock (county seat)

=== Townships ===
- Braintrim
- Clinton
- Eaton
- Exeter
- Falls
- Forkston
- Lemon
- Mehoopany
- Meshoppen
- Monroe
- Nicholson
- North Branch
- Northmoreland
- Noxen
- Overfield
- Tunkhannock
- Washington
- Windham

=== Census-designated places ===
- Lake Winola
- Noxen
- West Falls

=== Unincorporated communities ===
- Bellasylva
- Forkston
- Kasson Brook

=== Ghost towns ===
- Ricketts

=== Population ranking ===
The population ranking of the following table is based on the 2010 census of Wyoming County.

† county seat

Rank	City/Town/etc.	Municipal type	Population (2010 Census)
1	† Tunkhannock	Borough	1,836
2	Factoryville	Borough	1,158
3	Nicholson	Borough	767
4	Lake Winola	CDP	748
5	Noxen	CDP	633
6	Meshoppen	Borough	563
7	West Falls	CDP	382
8	Laceyville	Borough	379

== See also ==
- National Register of Historic Places listings in Wyoming County, Pennsylvania
