= Exeter Township, Wyoming County, Pennsylvania =

Township in Pennsylvania, US

Exeter Township
- Township
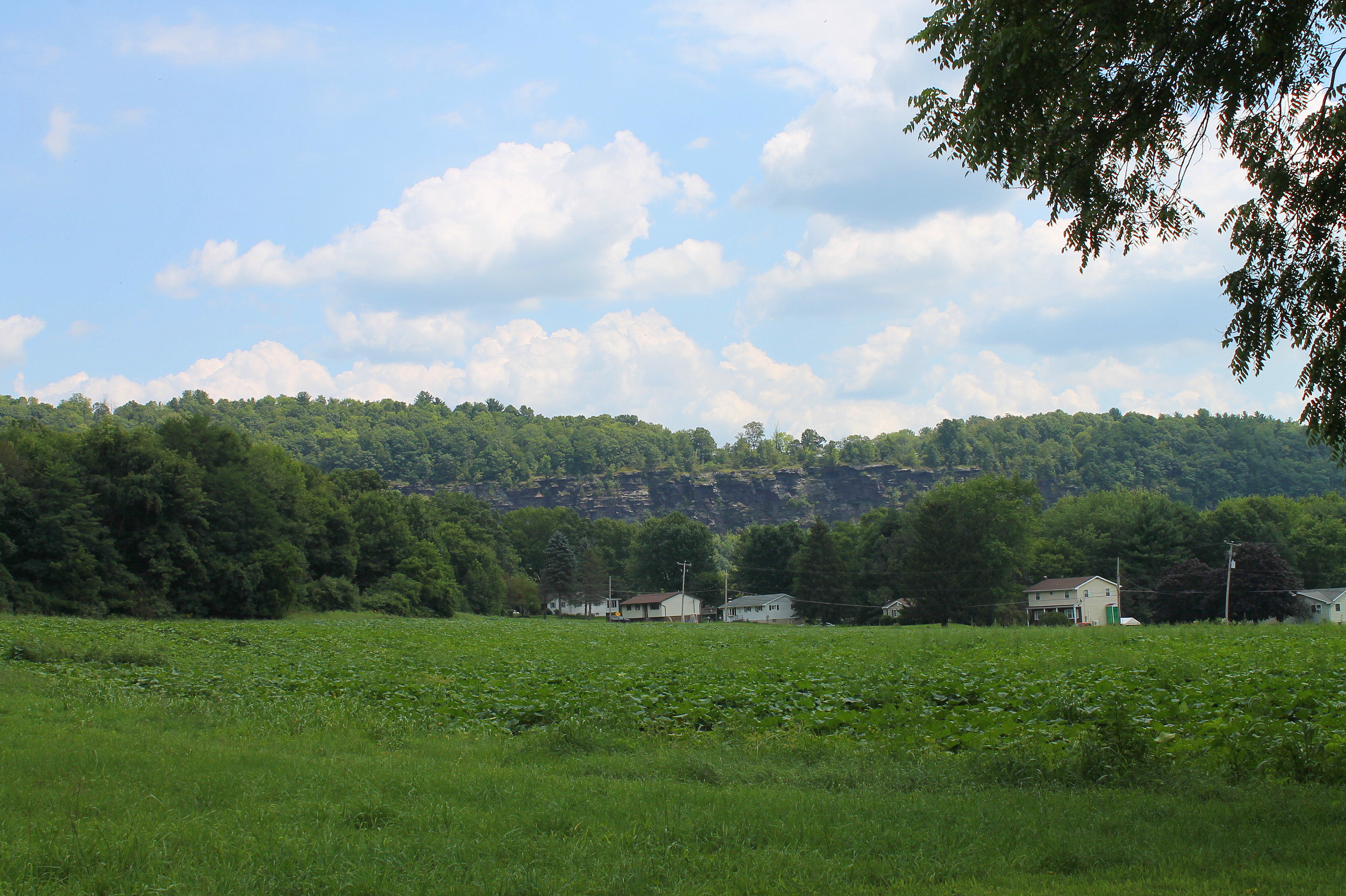
- Scenery of Exeter Township

- Logo

- Location of Exeter Township in Pennsylvania
- Coordinates: 41°25′06″N 75°52′30″W
- Country: United States
- State: Pennsylvania
- County: Wyoming

Area
  - Total: 3.39 sq mi (8.79 km^{2})
  - Land: 3.14 sq mi (8.12 km^{2})
  - Water: 0.26 sq mi (0.67 km^{2})
- Elevation: 991 ft (302 m)

Population (2020)
  - Total: 624 ▼
  - Estimate (2021): 622
  - Density: 209.9/sq mi (81.04/km^{2})
- Time zone: UTC-5 (EST)
  - Summer (DST): UTC-4 (EDT)
- ZIP Code: 18615
- Area code: 570
- FIPS code: 42-131-24408
- Website: exetertwpwyco.org

Exeter Township is a township in Wyoming County, Pennsylvania, United States. The population was 624 at the 2020 census, of whom 382 people live in the village of West Falls, a census-designated place within the township.

== Geography ==
According to the United States Census Bureau, the township has a total area of 3.4 square miles (8.8 km^{2}), of which 3.1 square miles (8.0 km^{2}) is land and 0.3 square miles (0.78 km^{2}) (8.82%) is water.

== Etymology ==
The name Exeter derives from the town of Exeter in Devon, England. Numerous other places have also been given the name Exeter.

== Demographics ==
Historical population
Census	Pop.	Note	%±
2010	690		—
2020	324		−53.0%
2021 (est.)	622		92.0%
U.S. Decennial Census

As of the census of 2010, there were 690 people, 311 households, and 187 families residing in the township. The population density was 222.6 inhabitants per square mile (85.9/km^{2}). There were 403 housing units at an average density of 128.7 per square mile (49.7/km^{2}). The racial makeup of the township was 98.7% White, 0.9% African American, and 0.4% from two or more races. Hispanic or Latino of any race were 1.4% of the population.

There were 311 households, out of which 20.9% had children under the age of 18 living with them, 50.8% were married couples living together, 5.8% had a female householder with no husband present, and 39.9% were non-families. 34.4% of all households were made up of individuals, and 16.7% had someone living alone who was 65 years of age or older. The average household size was 2.22 and the average family size was 2.89.

In the township the population was spread out, with 16.4% under the age of 18, 65.5% from 18 to 64, and 18.1% who were 65 years of age or older. The median age was 49.4 years.

The median income for a household in the township was $44,464, and the median income for a family was $56,944. Males had a median income of $38,125 versus $33,125 for females. The per capita income for the township was $23,003. About 2.9% of families and 6.8% of the population were below the poverty line, including none of those under age 18 and 12.8% of those age 65 or over.
