= National Register of Historic Places listings in Wyoming County, Pennsylvania =

Location of Wyoming County in Pennsylvania

This is a list of the National Register of Historic Places listings in Wyoming County, Pennsylvania.

This is intended to be a complete list of the properties and districts on the National Register of Historic Places in Wyoming County, Pennsylvania, United States. The locations of National Register properties and districts for which the latitude and longitude coordinates are included below, may be seen in a map.

There are 5 properties and districts listed on the National Register in the county.

This National Park Service list is complete through NPS recent listings posted August 22, 2025.

== Current listings ==
	Name on the Register	Image	Date listed	Location	City or town	Description
1	Bridge in Nicholson Township	Bridge in Nicholson Township	June 22, 1988 (#88000810)	Legislative Route 65021 over Tunkhannock Creek near Starkville; 41°36′17″N 75°49′24″W	Nicholson Township	
2	Noxen School	Noxen School	May 24, 2006 (#06000431)	School Street; 41°25′35″N 76°03′20″W	Noxen Township	
3	Old White Mill	Old White Mill	September 11, 1975 (#75001680)	Off Welles Street; 41°36′51″N 76°02′48″W	Meshoppen	
4	Tunkhannock Historic District	Tunkhannock Historic District	July 27, 2005 (#05000101)	Roughly bounded by Tioga, Pine, and Harrison Streets and Wyoming Avenue; 41°32′23″N 75°56′57″W	Tunkhannock	
5	Tunkhannock Viaduct	Tunkhannock Viaduct	April 11, 1977 (#77001203)	0.5 miles (0.8 km) east of Nicholson at Tunkhannock Creek; 41°37′28″N 75°46′37″W	Nicholson	

== See also ==
- List of Pennsylvania state historical markers in Wyoming County
