= Little Meshoppen Creek =

Physical characteristics
- Source
  - location: small, unnamed pond in Auburn Township, Pennsylvania
  - elevation: 1,325 ft (404 m)
- Mouth
  - location: Meshoppen Creek in Mehoopany, Wyoming County, Pennsylvania
  - coordinates: 41°36′50″N 76°02′52″W
  - elevation: 627 ft (191 m)
- Length: 9.5 mi (15.3 km)
- Basin size: 13.8 mi^{2} (36 km^{2})
- Discharge
  - location: below Meshoppen Water Company dam (1890s)
  - average: 141 US gallons per minute (0.53 m^{3}/min)

Basin features
- Progression: Meshoppen Creek → Susquehanna River → Chesapeake Bay
- Tributaries
  - left: three unnamed tributaries
  - right: three unnamed tributaries

Little Meshoppen Creek is a tributary of Meshoppen Creek in Susquehanna County and Wyoming County, in Pennsylvania, in the United States. It is approximately 9.5 miles (15.3 km) long and flows through Auburn Township in Susquehanna County and Messhoppen Township and Messhoppen in Wyoming County. The watershed of the creek has an area of 13.8 square miles (36 km^{2}). The creek is a Coldwater Fishery and Migratory Fishery and is not designated as an impaired waterbody. Numerous industries involved the creek in the 19th century, including a tannery, several mills, and a water company that constructed a dam on the creek.

== Course ==
Little Meshoppen Creek begins in a small, unnamed pond in Auburn Township, Susquehanna County. It flows south through a broad valley for over a mile before reaching White Pond. From the southwestern end of this pond, the creek flows south-southwest for a few miles, receiving two unnamed tributaries from the right. It then turns south for several tenths of a mile, passing near an unnamed pond and receiving an unnamed tributary from the left before turning south-southeast and then south-southwest, passing through Carlin Pond. At the southern end of the pond, the creek receives an unnamed tributary from the right and meanders south for a few miles, receiving another unnamed tributary from the left and eventually exiting Susquehanna County.

Upon exiting Susquehanna County, Little Meshoppen Creek enters Meshoppen Township, Wyoming County. Here, the creek meanders south-southeast for more than a mile before receiving an unnamed tributary from the right and crossing Pennsylvania Route 267. The creek flows south alongside Route 267 for a few tenths of a mile before turning southeast for several tenths of a mile. It then receives another unnamed tributary from the left before turning south, meandering in this direction for several tenths of a mile. In this reach, the creek enters the borough of Meshoppen and reaches its confluence with Meshoppen Creek.

Little Meshoppen Creek joins Meshoppen Creek 0.12 miles (0.19 km) upstream of its mouth.

== Hydrology, geography, and geology ==
The elevation near the mouth of Little Meshoppen Creek is 627 feet (191 m) above sea level. The elevation near the creek's source is 1,325 feet (404 m) above sea level.

Little Meshoppen Creek is not designated as an impaired waterbody. In a court case from the 1890s, several parties provided evidence that the creek had been shrinking for around 40 years. Measurements showed that the creek's discharge above the Meshoppen Water Company's dam was 150 US gallons per minute (0.57 m^{3}/min), while below the dam, it was 141 US gallons per minute (0.53 m^{3}/min).

== Watershed and biology ==
The watershed of Little Meshoppen Creek has an area of 13.8 square miles (36 km^{2}). The mouth of the creek is in the United States Geological Survey quadrangle of Meshoppen. However, its source is in the quadrangle of Auburn Center.

Roundtop Energy has been issued a permit to construct and maintain an electric aerial line crossing an unnamed tributary of Little Meshoppen Creek, as well as a 4-inch (10 cm) steel natural gas pipeline crossing two unnamed tributaries of the creek, and place fill and remove material from the floodway of an unnamed tributary for site entry and wetland mitigation.

Little Meshoppen Creek is classified as a Coldwater Fishery and a Migratory Fishery.

== History ==
Little Meshoppen Creek was entered into the Geographic Names Information System on August 2, 1979. Its identifier in the Geographic Names Information System is 1179598.

Ezekiel Mowrey built a sawmill on Little Meshoppen Creek in 1809. In 1840, a Dr. John Smith constructed a gristmill on the creek in its lower reaches. Clark Burr and his sons built a tannery near the sawmill in 1860. Meanwhile, the gristmill eventually came to be owned by Daniel Hankinson, who in 1868 nearly doubled the mill's size and made various other improvements.

The Meshoppen Water Company, which was chartered in 1869, had an iron water main running 1 mile (1.6 km) up Little Meshoppen Creek by 1880. Also by this year, a quarry was being operated by Brownscombe and King in the watershed. In the 1890s, the Meshoppen Water Company was sued by Dennis Harley for replacing their water main with a larger one, diverting additional water away from the creek.

A 23.0-foot (7.0 m) masonry arch bridge carrying Pennsylvania Route 267 over Little Meshoppen Creek in Meshoppen was built in 1893. A 36.1-foot (11.0 m) concrete tee beam bridge was built over the creek in Meshoppen in 1927. As of 2017, the Pennsylvania Route 267 bridge in Meshoppen is slated for replacement. A longer and wider replacement, built to last 100 years, was opened in November 2017.

== See also ==
- West Branch Meshoppen Creek, next tributary of Meshoppen Creek going upstream
- List of rivers of Pennsylvania
