= Meshoppen =

Meshoppen can refer to:

- Meshoppen Township, Pennsylvania
- The borough of Meshoppen, Pennsylvania
