= Sunbury Line (Norfolk Southern) =

Overview
- Other name: Sunbury Subdivision
- Owner: Norfolk Southern Railway
- Termini: Binghamton, New York, U.S.; Sunbury, Pennsylvania, U.S.

Service
- Type: Freight
- System: Harrisburg Division
- Operator: Norfolk Southern Railway

History
- Opened: 1851 (Delaware, Lackawanna and Western Railroad), 1869 and 1871 (Danville, Hazelton and Wilkes-Barre Railroad), 1880s (North and West Branch Railway), 1915 (Delaware, Lackawanna and Western Railroad- Nicholson Cutoff)

Technical
- Number of tracks: 1-2
- Track gauge: 1,435 mm (4 ft 8 1/2 in) standard gauge

The Sunbury Line, formerly known as Sunbury Subdivision, is a rail line owned and operated by Norfolk Southern Railway which in turn is owned by the Norfolk Southern Corporation. The rail line travels from Sunbury, Pennsylvania via Scranton, Pennsylvania, to Binghamton, New York. It connects with NS Buffalo Line at Sunbury and NS Southern Tier Line at Binghamton.

The Sunbury Line's trackage consists of former trackage that belonged to the rail systems of the Pennsylvania Railroad, Delaware and Hudson Railway and the Delaware, Lackawanna and Western Railroad. The Delaware, Lackawanna and Western's well-known Nicholson Cutoff railroad segment, including the Tunkhannock Viaduct, is one of the components of the Sunbury Line.

== History ==
=== 19th century ===
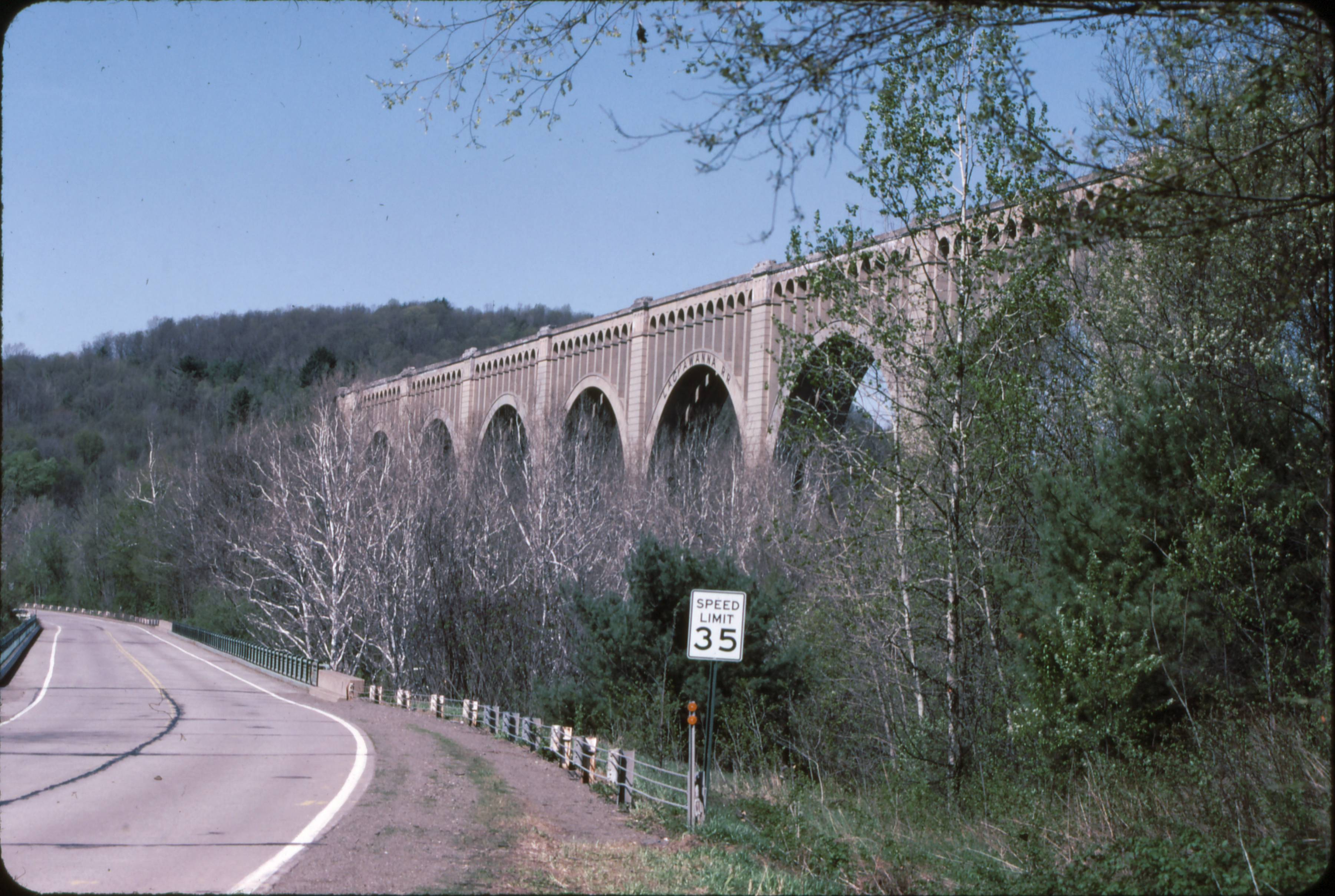
The Tunkhannock Viaduct on the Sunbury Line at the Nicholson Cutoff in Nicholson, Pennsylvania; the bridge is 240 feet (73.15 m) high and 2,375 feet (724 m) long and believed to be the largest reinforced concrete structure in the world.

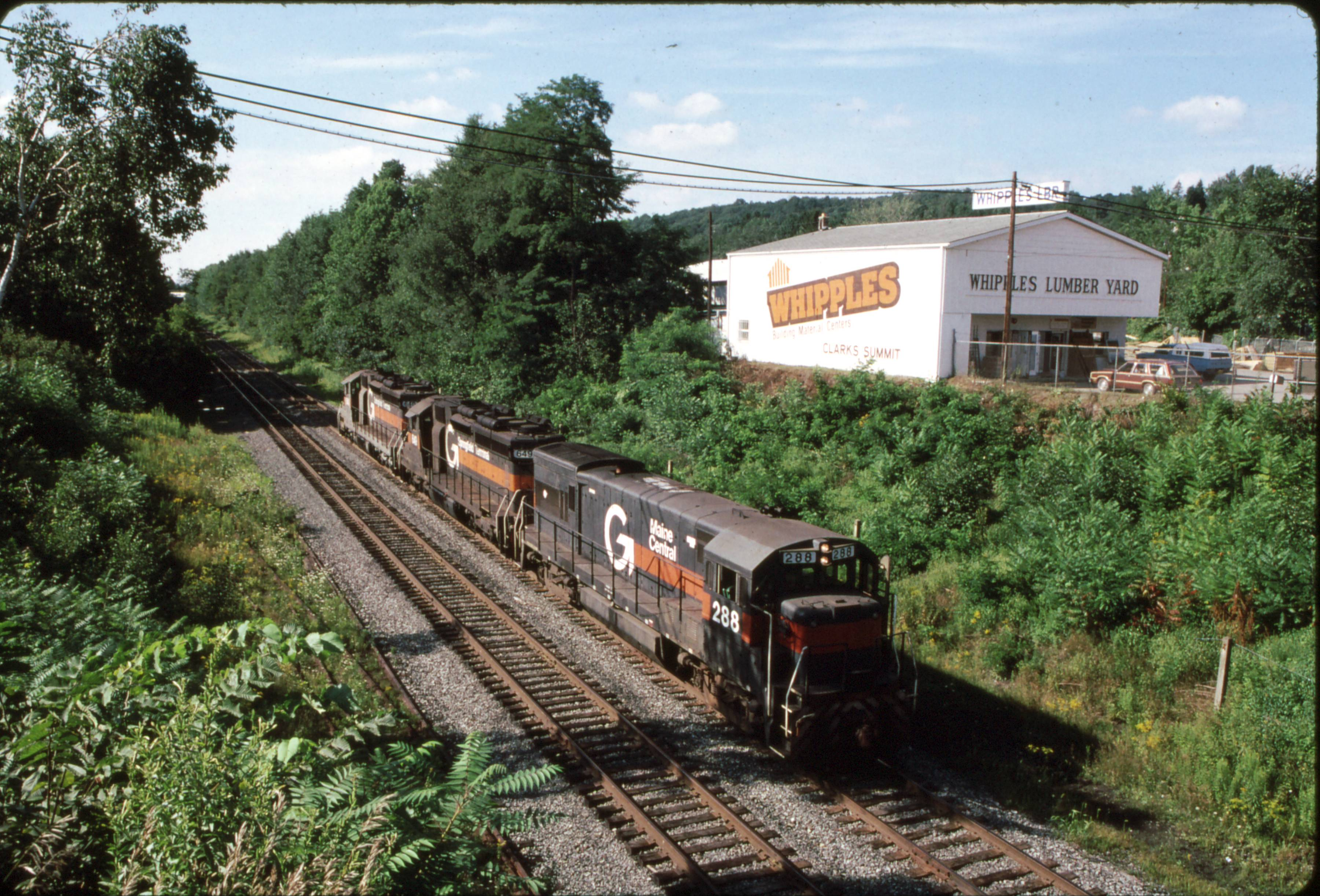
The eastern starting point of the Nicholson Cutoff at milepost 140.5 in Clarks Summit, Pennsylvania showing three Guilford Rail System pusher units from Scranton, Pennsylvania

The Sunbury Line is a former Pennsylvania Railroad property connecting its core system with the other anthracite rail lines in and around Wilkes-Barre, Pennsylvania; the line's Pennsylvania Railroad trackage was once the Wilkes-Barre Branch. It is a former Delaware, Lackawanna and Western Railroad property and was once part of the Delaware, Lackawanna and Western main line. This part of the Delaware, Lackawanna and Western main line which is now part of the Sunbury Line contains the Nicholson Cutoff and former Delaware, Lackawanna and Western Railroad trackage.

The PRR Wilkes-Barre Branch ran from the downtown Wilkes-Barre rail cluster southwest to Sunbury along tracks on the east (left) shore of the North Branch Susquehanna River. The Danville, Hazelton and Wilkes-Barre Railroad opened from Sunbury to South Danville in 1869 and past Catawissa to Tomhicken in 1871.

The North and West Branch Railway opened the line from Catawissa to Wilkes-Barre in the early 1880s, completing the line soon to be called Wilkes-Barre Branch.

=== 20th century ===
In 1960, the Delaware, Lackawanna and Western later merged with the Erie Railroad in 1960 to form the Erie Lackawanna Railway. The line became part of the Pennsylvania Railroad and became known as the Wilkes-Barre Branch under PRR ownership. The PRR Wilkes-Barre Branch was passed to Penn Central in 1968, which was created by the merger between the PRR and the New York Central Railroad.

The former PRR Wilkes-Barre Branch from Wilkes-Barre to Hanover Township is owned by Luzerne County and operated by the Luzerne Susquehanna Railway. The remainder of the PRR Wilkes-Barre Branch that is now part of the Sunbury Line runs from Sunbury to Hanover Township, to what was PRR's Buttonwood Yard, where it connected with the former Wilkes-Barre Connecting Railroad that extended from Hanover Township to Hudson, Pennsylvania.

In 1976, the Pennsylvania Railroad Wilkes-Barre Branch and the Delaware Lackawanna and Western Railroad main line were taken over by Conrail due to Penn Central and the Erie Lackawanna Railway being absorbed into Conrail, with trackage rights assigned to the Delaware and Hudson Railway. The D&H acquired the majority of the PRR Wilkes-Barre Branch and the Scranton to Binghamton track of the Delaware, Lackawanna and Western main line, which includes the Nicholson Cutoff, in 1980, and combined it with part of its main line from Binghamton to Schenectady, New York, to form the new Delaware and Hudson South Line. The D&H main line continues in existence, now running from Schenectady to Montreal.

The D&H was then acquired by the Guilford Rail System, now Norfolk Southern, a railroad owned by Guilford Transportation Industries, now CSX Corporation. The corporate structure was Guilford Transportation as the parent company, Guilford Rail as direct subsidiary and owner of the D&H and the D&H as indirect subsidiary. The D&H went bankrupt while owned by Guilford Transportation's Guilford Rail and, during the bankruptcy, the New York, Susquehanna and Western Railway ran its trains on the D&H South Line and the rest of the D&H. The New York, Susquehanna and Western was ordered to operate the D&H until a new buyer was found for the D&H.

The Canadian Pacific Railway then took over the D&H, but kept the D&H corporation in existence instead of absorbing it into the CPR. Canadian Pacific's takeover of the D&H included the D&H South Line, and Canadian Pacific then broke it into two new rail lines. The D&H South Line from Sunbury to Binghamton, made up of the PRR Wilkes-Barre Branch and Delaware, Lackawanna and Western main line trackage, including the Nicholson Cutoff, became the new 'Sunbury Line, and the D&H South Line from Binghamton to Schenectady, once part of the D&H main line, became its own individual line and was not added back to the D&H main line; the Sunbury Line was later renamed Sunbury Subdivision.

=== 21st century ===
In 2015, Norfolk Southern purchased the Sunbury Subdivision from Canadian Pacific in a direct transaction from the Delaware and Hudson and not from Canadian Pacific directly. After the purchase, Norfolk Southern renamed the line back to Sunbury Line.

Norfolk Southern's purchase of the rail line took effect on September 19, 2015, and included the former D&H main line and D&H South Line from Binghamton to Schenectady, New York. Norfolk Southern labeled this D&H trackage as "Freight Line".
