= Blue Ridge Mountain, Pennsylvania =

Mountain in Pennsylvania, United States

Nesquehoning Mountain
- Location of Wyoming County, Pennsylvania and Blue Ridge Mountain

Highest point
- Elevation: 1,171 ft (357 m)
- Coordinates: 41°36′28″N 76°05′35″W

Dimensions
- Length: 25 mi (40 km) east-west
- Width: 1–2 km (0.62–1.24 mi) north-south

Geography
- Country: United States
- State: Pennsylvania
- Borders on: Ridge-and-Valley Appalachians and Glaciated Low Plateau Section

Geology
- Orogeny: Appalachian Mountains
- Rock age: Silurian
- Rock types: Tuscarora Formation, Shawangunk Formation and sedimentary

Blue Ridge Mountain is an isolated single peak in Wyoming County, Pennsylvania overlooking a loop of the Main Branch Susquehanna River in the sparsely settled Endless Mountains in Northeastern Pennsylvania a couple of miles west of Meshoppen at latitude, longitude coordinates: 41.6078537, -76.0929827 overlooking the northern end of the Wyoming Valley region. U.S. Route 6, a main east-west secondary highway and the railroad tracks built by the Lehigh Valley Railroad once followed by the famous Black Diamond Express named luxury trains on their daily runs from New York City to Buffalo, New York passes by its foot between the summit and the left bank (north) of the Susquehanna River.
