= List of Pennsylvania state historical markers in Wyoming County =

Location of Wyoming County in Pennsylvania

This is a list of the Pennsylvania state historical markers in Wyoming County.

This is intended to be a complete list of the official state historical markers placed in Wyoming County, Pennsylvania by the Pennsylvania Historical and Museum Commission (PHMC). The locations of the historical markers, as well as the latitude and longitude coordinates as provided by the PHMC's database, are included below when available. There are 13 historical markers located in Wyoming County.

== Historical markers ==
Marker title	Image	Date dedicated	Location	Marker type	Topics
Christy Mathewson (1880-1925)		August 8, 1998	College Ave. at Edwards Ln., in front of Keystone College, E end of Factoryville; 41.55961°N 75.77641°W	Roadside	Baseball, Military Post-Civil War, Sports
Sullivan Expedition Against the Iroquois Indians, 1779 - Quialutimack (PLAQUE)		n/a	PA 92, 2.8 miles S of Falls, .2 mile N of Wyoming-Luzerne Co. line (MISSING); 41.42748°N 75.84183°W	Plaque	American Revolution, Military, Native American
Sullivan Expedition Against the Iroquois Indians, 1779 - Tunkhannock (PLAQUE)		1929	US 6 (W Tioga St.) & Warren St., Tunkhannock; 41.53849°N 75.94858°W	Plaque	American Revolution, Military, Native American
Sullivan Expedition Against the Iroquois Indians, 1779 - Vanderlip's Farm (PLAQUE)		n/a	US 6 at Bluestone Rd., Black Walnut; 41.61422°N 76.11785°W	Plaque	American Revolution, Military, Native American
Sullivan's March		May 1, 1947	US Bus. Rt. 6 (W. Tioga St.) at Warren St., Tunkhannock; 41.53849°N 75.94858°W	Roadside	American Revolution, Forts, Military, Native American
Sullivan's March		May 1947	Pa. 92, 2.8 miles S of Falls; 41.42748°N 75.84183°W	Roadside	American Revolution, Military
Sullivan's March		May 1, 1947	US 6 at Blue Stone, near Black Walnut; 41.61422°N 76.11785°W	Roadside	American Revolution, Military
Tunkhannock		May 23, 1947	Rt. 6 (Tunkhannock) bypass & Bridge St. (PA 29), at bridge, Tunkhannock; 41.53693°N 75.94803°W	Roadside	Cities & Towns, Early Settlement, Native American
Tunkhannock		May 28, 1947	PA 92, south of Tunkhannock (MISSING)	Roadside	Cities & Towns, Early Settlement, Native American
Tunkhannock Viaduct		September 16, 1995	Nicholson Bridge, Lackawanna Trail (US 11), at park monument, N end of viaduct, .5 mile S of Nicholson; 41.62116°N 75.77855°W	Roadside	Canals, Navigation, Transportation
Walter B. Tewksbury (1876-1968)		July 21, 2000	Memorial Field, Tunkhannock Area H. S., Maple Ave. & Pennsylvania Ave., 200 yards from Route 6, Tunkhannock; 41.54269°N 75.95531°W	Roadside	Medicine & Science, Sports
Wyolutimunk		August 16, 1949	PA 92, 2.3 miles S of Falls, .2 mile N of Wyoming-Luzerne Co. line 41.42945°N 75.84532°W	Roadside	Early Settlement, Native American
Wyoming County		July 9, 1982	County Courthouse, Warren St., Tunkhannock; 41.540070°N 75.947682°W	City	Government & Politics, Government & Politics 19th Century, Native American

== See also ==
- List of Pennsylvania state historical markers
- National Register of Historic Places listings in Wyoming County, Pennsylvania
