= Nicholson Cutoff =

Rail line segment

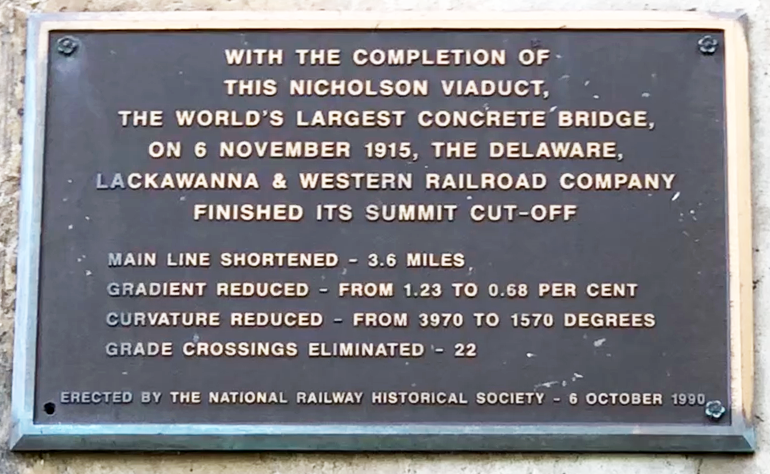
In 1990, The National Railroad Historical Society designated this structure as a historic railroad landmark.

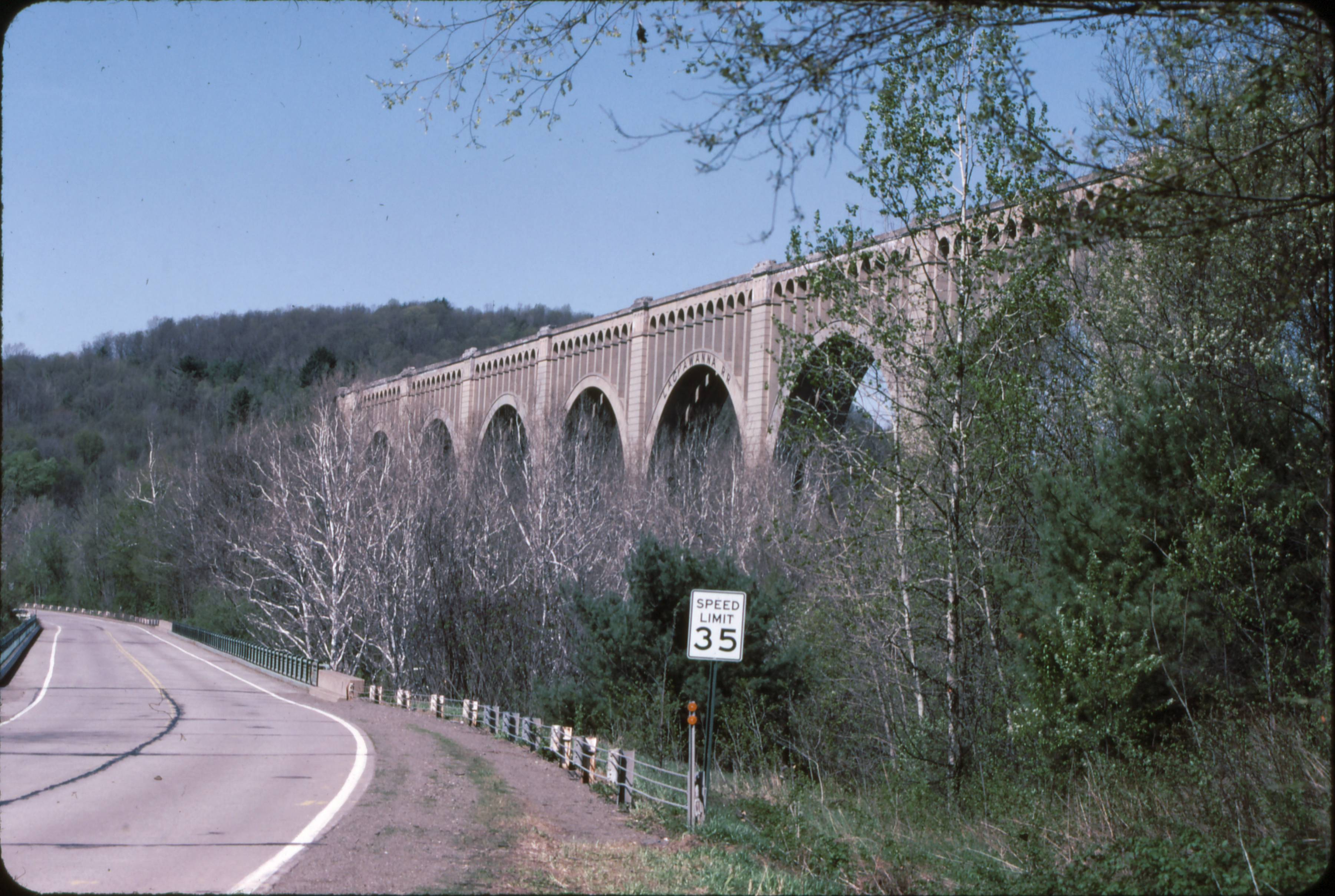
The Tunkhannock Viaduct on the Nicholson Cutoff in 1989. Located near Milepost 162 in Nicholson, Pennsylvania, the bridge is 240 feet (73.15 m) high and 2,375 feet (724 m) long. It is believed to be the largest reinforced concrete structure in the world. The roadway, US Route 11, follows the right-of-way of the old line that the cutoff replaced.

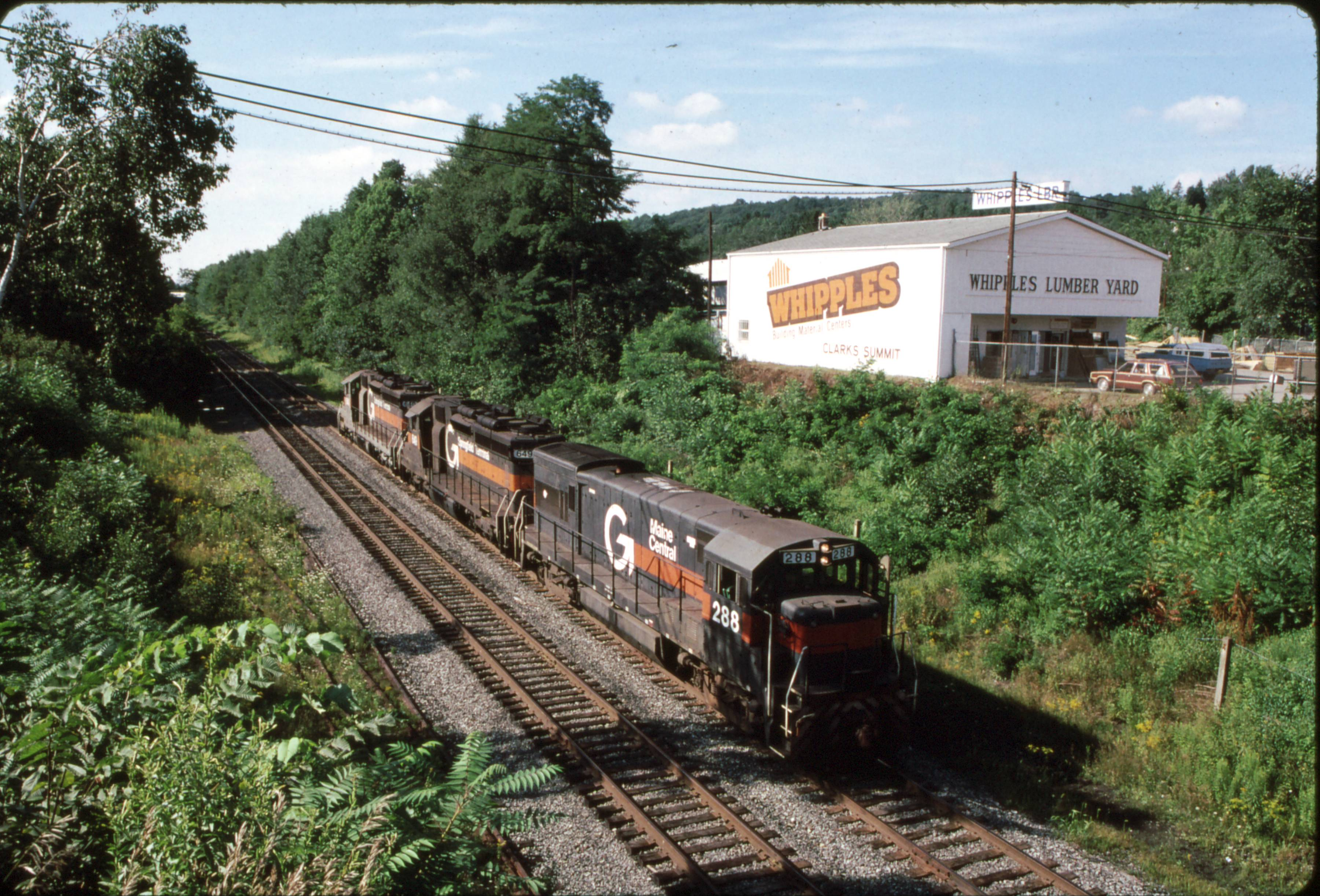
The eastern starting point of the Nicholson Cutoff (milepost 152) in Clarks Summit in 1989 shows three Guilford Rail System pusher units awaiting their next assignment after pushing a long freight up the grade from Scranton, Pennsylvania. Note the weed-covered switch in the foreground, a vestige of the old line that ran past the Clarks Summit passenger station, about a mile away on the hill to the left. The station was not rebuilt even though the new line was a considerable distance down the hill from the old line.

The Nicholson Cutoff (also known as Clark's Summit–Hallstead Cutoff) is a rail line segment of the Sunbury Line rail line and formerly a rail line segment of the Delaware, Lackawanna and Western Railroad main line and the Delaware and Hudson Railway South Line. The Nicholson Cutoff and the rest of the Sunbury Line is owned by Norfolk Southern Railway.

== History ==
The Nicholson Cutoff was built by the Delaware, Lackawanna and Western Railroad to replace the original Lackawanna line between Clarks Summit, Pennsylvania, and Hallstead, Pennsylvania. In surveying potential routes for the new line, the Lackawanna investigated the possibility of building a line directly from Clarks Summit to Nichols, New York, bypassing Binghamton, New York. This alignment would have shaved 20 miles (32 km) off the existing route between these two points but was deemed impractical not only because it would have bypassed a major junction point on the railroad, but also because of the amount of cutting and filling that would have been needed to build this route. As about half of the old line was curved track, a major rationale for building the new line would be to "straighten-out" the route. The new route, the cutoff, would ultimately eliminate two-thirds of this curvature, 2400 degrees, the equivalent of more than six and a half circles. Nearly all the remaining curves would be 2° (2,864.75 ft or 873.18 m radius) or less, permitting 70 mph (113 km/h) or greater for passenger trains. This was a decided improvement over the curves on the old route, some of which exceeded 6° (955.37 ft or 291.20 m radius, restricting trains to 35 mph or 56 km/h).

Construction on the Nicholson Cutoff started in May 1912 and the first revenue train to run over the line was on November 6, 1915. While the new 39.6-mile (63.7 km) line resulted in only a modest savings in travel distance (3.6 miles or 5.8 km) the cutoff saved a significant amount of travel time between Scranton, Pennsylvania, and Binghamton, New York, especially for freight trains. Before the building of the cutoff, heavy westbound coal trains, bringing anthracite coal from Scranton, required pushers to be added in three different locations—LaPlume, Nicholson, and Hallstead—once they got past the top of the grade at Clarks Summit. The new line eliminated the need for these additional engines and crews, not to mention that these trains no longer needed to stop for the pushers to be added.

The Cutoff was built in a manner similar to that of the Lackawanna Cut-Off in New Jersey that had opened in December 1911. This is not surprising as the chief civil engineer on both projects was George J. Ray. But unlike the New Jersey Cut-Off, which used reinforced concrete in all its structures, the Pennsylvania Cutoff used other materials (such as bricks) as well. Indeed, the brick-lined Nicholson Tunnel (3,629 feet or 1,106 m long, located at Milepost 160) is the only tunnel on the cutoff, and the only brick-lined tunnel ever constructed by the Lackawanna. Nevertheless, the most significant structures on the line, the viaducts at Nicholson, Pennsylvania and Martins Creek, Pennsylvania, were built of reinforced concrete. The Tunkhannock Viaduct at Nicholson, the line's namesake, is considered to be the world's largest concrete structure. Built with approximately 700,000,000 pounds (320,000,000 kg) of concrete, its ten spans go 60 feet (18.29 m) below ground-level to bedrock, making the center span of the bridge effectively 300 feet (91 m) tall. Over the years, Nicholson Viaduct would become a symbol of the engineering accomplishments of the Lackawanna.

The Nicholson Cutoff was used for freight and passenger trains of the Delaware, Lackawanna and Western Railroad and later used for trains of the Erie Lackawanna Railway, Conrail, Delaware and Hudson Railway, Guilford Rail System (now CSX Corporation), New York, Susquehanna and Western Railway, Canadian Pacific Railway and Norfolk Southern Railway. Noteworthy passenger trains included the Lackawanna's (and later, the Erie Lackawanna's as well) Phoebe Snow, Owl and New York Mail. However, the named trains did not stop at the towns en route, except, in some instances, Hallstead and New Milford.

The Nicholson Cutoff was opened as a rail line, however it became a rail line segment when it became part of the Delaware, Lackawanna and Western main line. Currently as a rail line segment, the Nicholson Cutoff served as part of the Delaware, Lackawanna and Western main line, the Delaware and Hudson South Line and now the Sunbury Line. In 2015, the Nicholson Cutoff and the rest of the Sunbury Line became a Norfolk Southern property.
