= John Nicholson (Pennsylvania comptroller general) =

Welsh-born American financier (1757–1800)

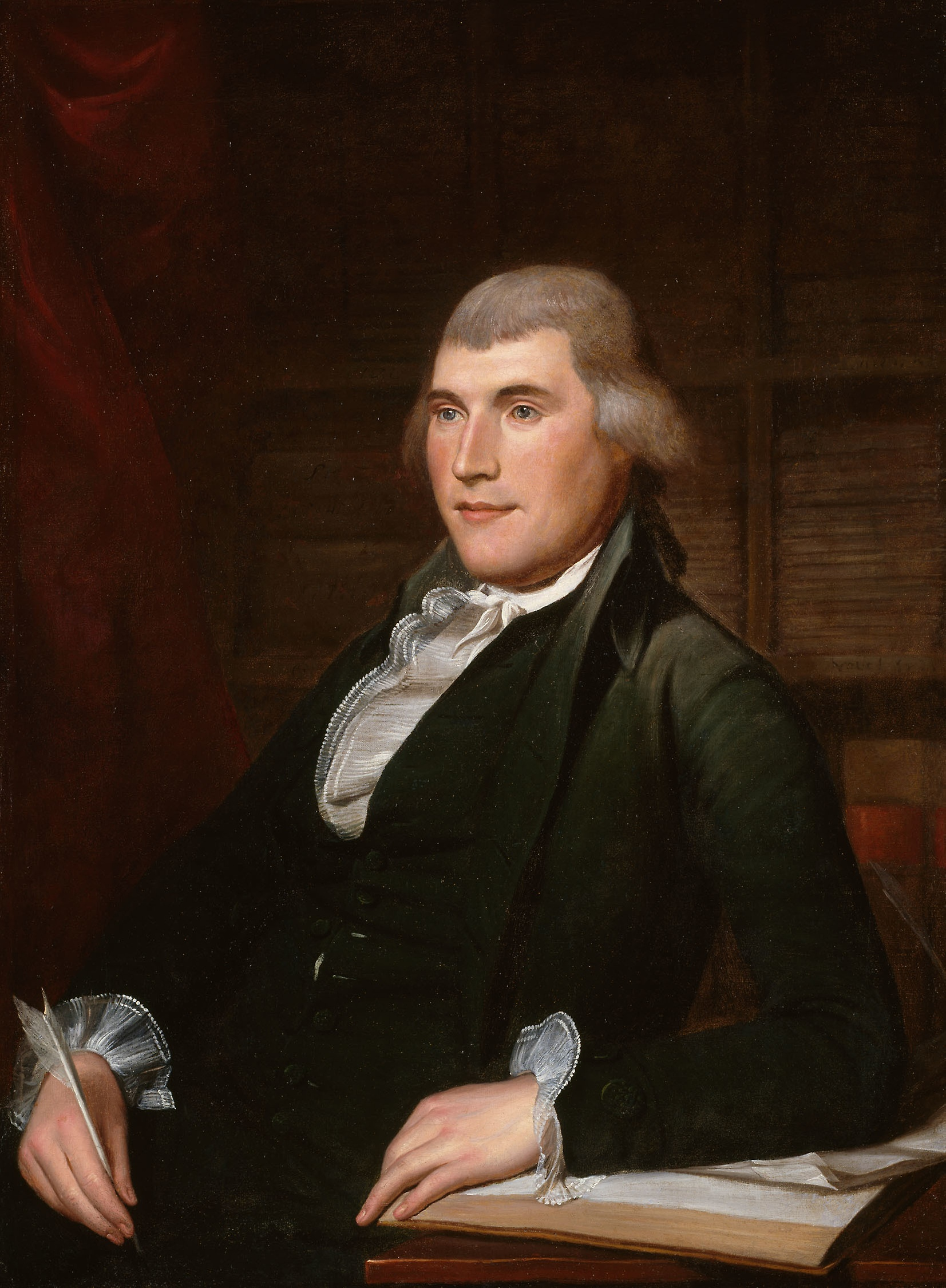
- Portrait of John Nicholson by Charles Willson Peale, 1790

Comptroller General of Pennsylvania
- In office April 13, 1782 – April 19, 1794

Personal details
- Born: 1757 Wales
- Died: December 5, 1800 (aged 42–43) Philadelphia, Pennsylvania
- Occupation: Financier, government official, land speculator

John Nicholson (1757 – December 5, 1800) was a Welsh-born American financier and government official who served as Pennsylvania's comptroller general from 1782 to 1794. He played a key role in managing the Commonwealth's finances in the post-Revolutionary era but became widely known for his land speculation activities and eventual financial collapse.

== Early life and career ==
Nicholson was born in Wales in 1757. At a young age, Nicholson emigrated to Philadelphia with his brother Samuel before eventually settling in Cumberland County, Pennsylvania, near Shippensburg, by 1775.

In 1778, Nicholson became clerk to the Board of Treasury under the Continental Congress. In early 1781, he resigned to serve as a commissioner auditing accounts of the Pennsylvania Line.

== Political career ==
Nicholson was first appointed as one of three commissioners of accounts for Pennsylvania in 1781. The following year, the legislature replaced that commission with the new office of Comptroller General and named Nicholson to the post, granting him broad authority over the state's finances. He held the position for twelve years, during which time he was, as described by Donald H. Kent of the Pennsylvania Historical and Museum Commission, the "virtual fiscal dictator of Pennsylvania." Under his management, Pennsylvania became the first state to achieve financial stability after the disruptions of the Revolution.

=== Comptroller General of Pennsylvania (1782–1794) ===
On April 13, 1782, the Pennsylvania General Assembly created the office of Comptroller General to handle the state's unsettled finances after the Revolution. Nicholson, then in his mid-twenties, was appointed as the first holder of the office. His office was tasked with auditing, liquidating, and adjusting the Commonwealth's accounts, overseeing the Commonwealth's revenues and spending, collecting debts owed to the Commonwealth, issuing certificates that could circulate as public credit, and managing financial claims in the aftermath of the Revolution. This position gave him wide influence and made him one of the most powerful public officials in Pennsylvania.

Early in his time in office, Nicholson had to deal with depreciation certificates issued during the war. These were promises of future payment given to Revolutionary War soldiers and public servants to make up for the rapid decline in value of the Continental paper currency they had received.

In 1792, Nicholson negotiated with the federal government on behalf of the state to purchase the 202,000-acre (820 km^{2}) tract known as the Erie Triangle. The land was ceded by the federal government to Pennsylvania in exchange for a monetary payment, giving the state access to a freshwater port on Lake Erie. While negotiating the deal, Nicholson, along with Robert Morris, Aaron Burr, agents of the Holland Land Company, and other individual and institutional investors, formed the Pennsylvania Population Company. This front organization arranged to purchase all 390 parcels of land in the Erie Triangle, marking Nicholson's first major venture into land speculation.

=== Other offices held ===
Nicholson was also appointed to two other offices which he held at the same time as Comptroller General. In 1785 he became Receiver General, with responsibility for coordinating state revenues, and in 1787 he was made Escheator General, managing estates confiscated from Loyalists. Holding these multiple posts meant that a large share of Pennsylvania's fiscal authority rested in his hands, a point later raised by his critics.

=== Political views and party alignment ===
As Comptroller General, Nicholson had to manage the state's transition to a new fiscal system under the federal Constitution. Nicholson often argued that Pennsylvania should keep control of its own fiscal matters, and he clashed with Federalist members of the legislature who wanted closer coordination with the federal government on financial matters.

Politically, Nicholson backed the Pennsylvania Constitution of 1776 and leaned toward Anti-Federalist views. He stressed the power of the legislature and defended Pennsylvania's democratic framework, which made him a polarizing figure. In a 1790 letter to George Washington, he wrote that he felt he had been unfairly targeted for his political views.

=== Controversy, impeachment, and resignation ===
Criticism of Nicholson increased in the early 1790s. In 1793, the Pennsylvania House of Representatives impeached him on several counts of high misdemeanors. The central charge was that he had certified certificates as valid debts when no such debts existed, which was said to have cost the treasury more than £5,100. Nicholson's role in the Pennsylvania Population Company and its land transactions in the Erie Triangle was also cited among the charges.

The Senate trial began in March 1794. The House appointed Benjamin R. Morgan as lead manager, joined by Attorney General Jared Ingersoll and others. Nicholson's defense team included Edward Tilghman and William Lewis. The prosecution claimed that he had misapplied funds and inflated the state's obligations. They presented depositions and testimony from state officials and merchants to support these charges.

Nicholson's lawyers argued that the case was political. They maintained that his accounting methods were legal, that any errors were clerical, and that the prosecution had failed to prove intentional fraud. They also protested the use of private depositions, saying these were not proper evidence.

On April 11, 1794, the Senate voted to acquit him. Nicholson was cleared of the charges, but the trial left a mark on his reputation. Together with his land dealings and mounting debts, the impeachment episode contributed to his decision to resign on April 19, 1794.

== Later business career ==
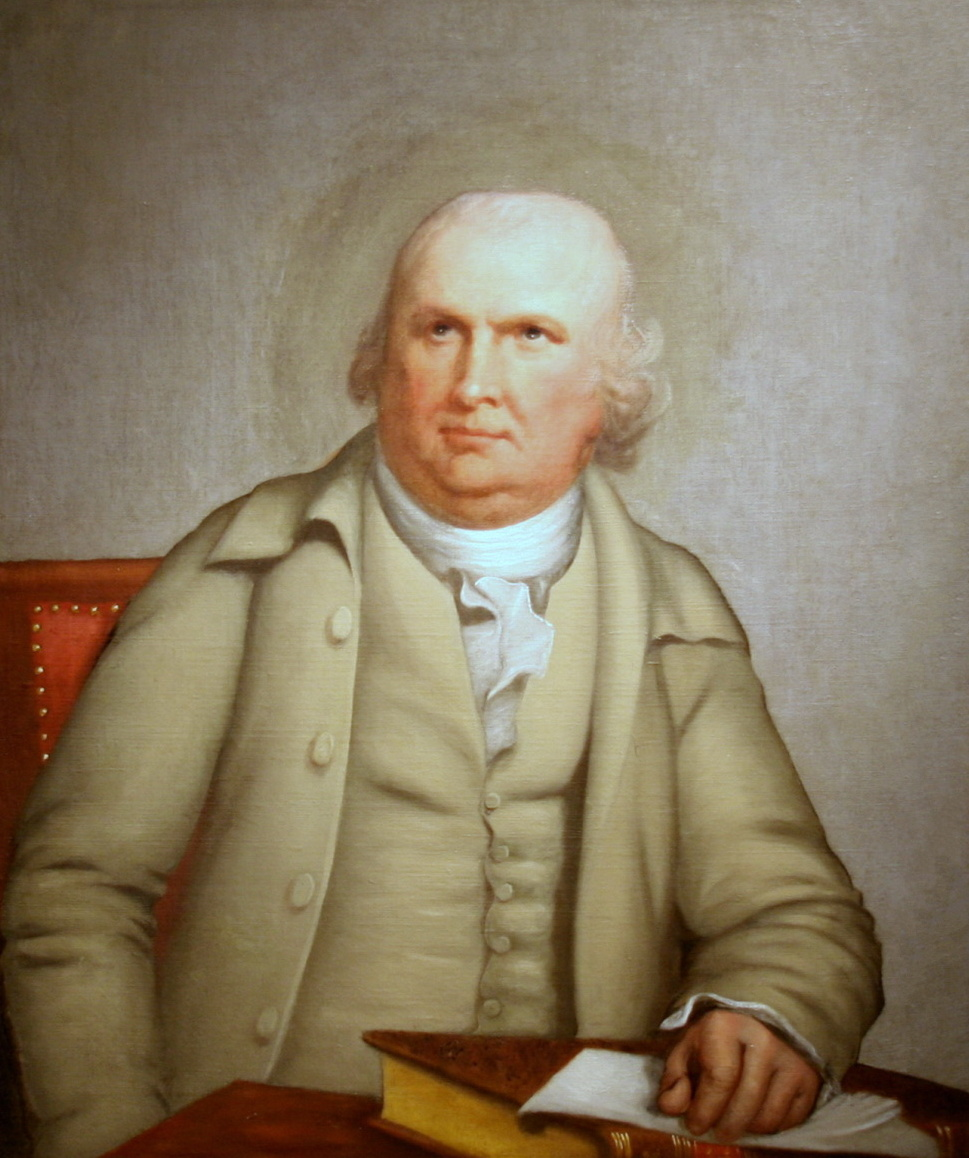
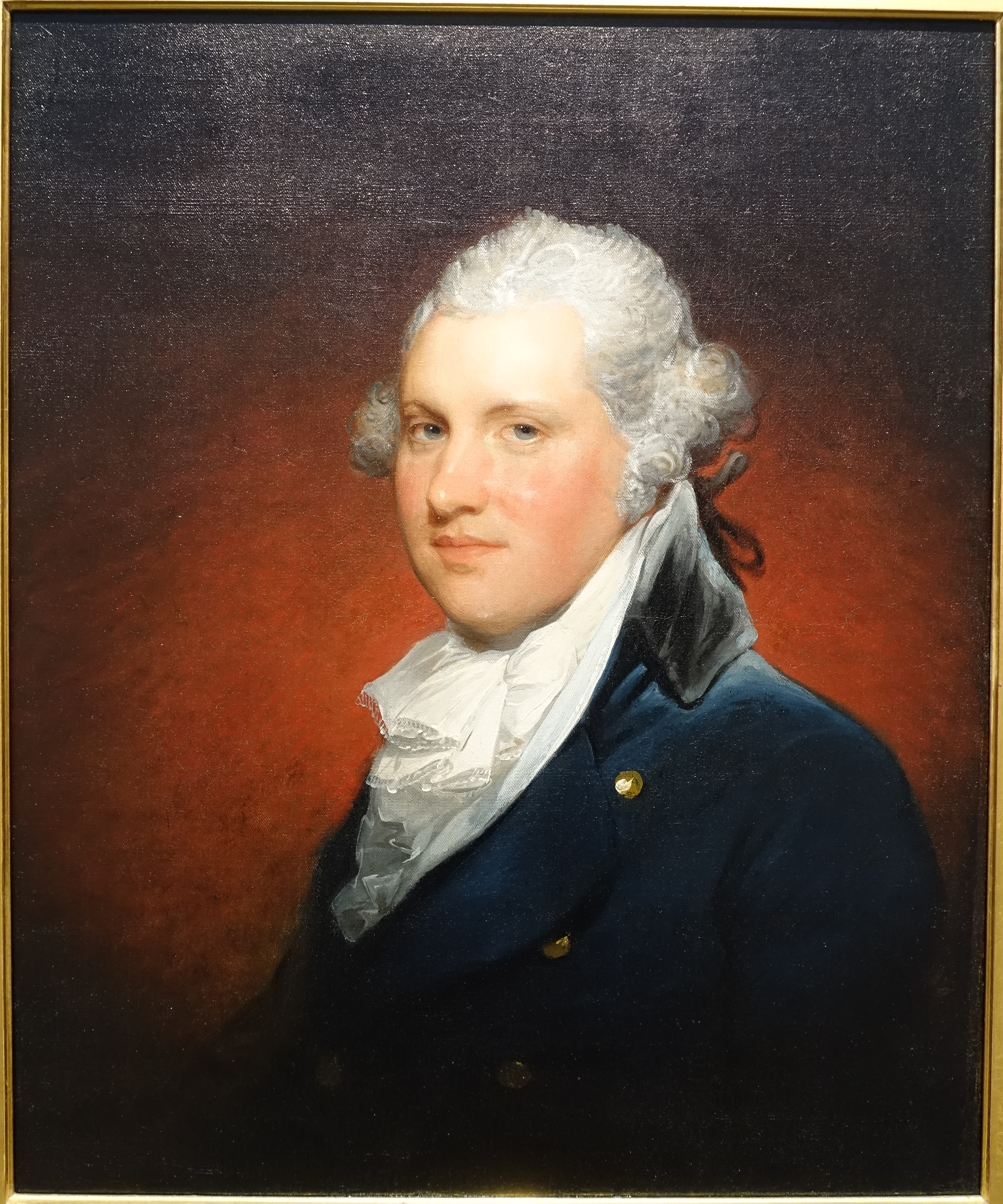
Robert Morris (left) and James Greenleaf (right), Nicholson's partners in land speculation

After leaving office, Nicholson shifted his focus towards commercial ventures. Having already played a major role in organizing the Pennsylvania Population Company while still in office, he continued to expand his activities in land speculation after his resignation. In early 1793, he organized a land company in which Robert Morris purchased shares, deepening the business partnership between Nicholson and Morris. Later that year, Nicholson, Morris, and James Greenleaf jointly purchased thousands of lots in the newly established District of Columbia. The partners also acquired millions of acres in Pennsylvania, Kentucky, Virginia, Georgia, and the Carolinas. To finance these ventures, they relied heavily on credit, intending to resell the land at a profit. By 1795, however, the three men still owed their creditors roughly $12 million (equivalent to about $228 million in 2025).

In 1794, Nicholson and Morris created another major venture, the Asylum Company, with the aim of settling French émigrés on a tract of 1,000,000 acres in northern Pennsylvania, in addition to land they already controlled in Luzerne, Northumberland, and Northampton.

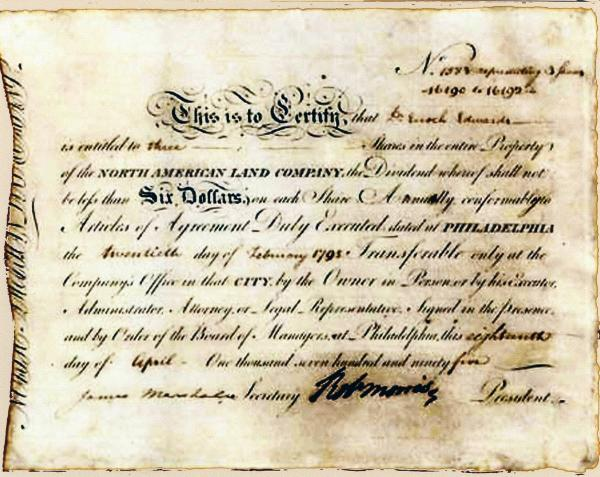
Share certificate issued by the North American Land Company on March 16, 1795.

In 1795, Nicholson, Morris, and Greenleaf consolidated their holdings into the North American Land Company (NALC), described by historian A. M. Sakolski as the "largest land trust ever known in America." The company claimed more than 6,000,000 acres (24,000 km^{2}) of land across several states, including 647,076 acres (2,618.62 km^{2}) in Pennsylvania, 431,043 acres (1,744.37 km^{2}) in Kentucky, 932,621 acres (3,774.18 km^{2}) in Virginia, 717,249 acres (2,902.60 km^{2}) in North Carolina, 957,238 acres (3,873.80 km^{2}) in South Carolina, and 2,314,796 acres (9,367.65 km^{2}) in Georgia. Authorized to issue 30,000 shares at $100 each, the company promised investors a 6 percent annual dividend, with Nicholson and his partners placing their own shares in escrow as collateral. Nicholson and his partners also received commissions on land sales, while Greenleaf served as company secretary.

Almost immediately, NALC encountered financial difficulties. The company was unable to issue its full allotment of shares because many land titles proved defective, and in some cases, the properties were barren or otherwise misrepresented. To cover obligations, Nicholson and his partners often guaranteed one another's notes, which soon flooded the market at deep discounts. By 1798, more than $10 million in their personal notes were trading at one-eighth of face value. The partners also failed to meet their contractual obligations to the D.C. Commissioners for development of the capital city lots, leading to litigation and loss of properties.

Relations among the three speculators deteriorated rapidly. Nicholson, in particular, grew hostile toward Greenleaf and began publishing accusations against him in print. By 1796, Greenleaf sold his interest in NALC to Morris and Nicholson for $1.5 million, but they funded the purchase by issuing additional personal notes, further weakening their financial standing.

== Financial collapse, imprisonment, and death ==
During the Panic of 1796–97 and its aftermath, the land market collapsed and Nicholson's speculative land and real-estate ventures unraveled. Deeply overextended, he was unable to satisfy his creditors. By 1796, state audits showed he personally owed Pennsylvania more than $58,000, in addition to his much larger private debts.

Nicholson was imprisoned for debt in Philadelphia, where he died on December 5, 1800, reportedly owing more than four million dollars. An obituary in Poulson's American Daily Advertiser reported that Nicholson died "after a short sickness," leaving a widow and eight young children. Later court cases confirmed that his heirs were minors at the time of his death and soon left Pennsylvania.

== Personal life ==
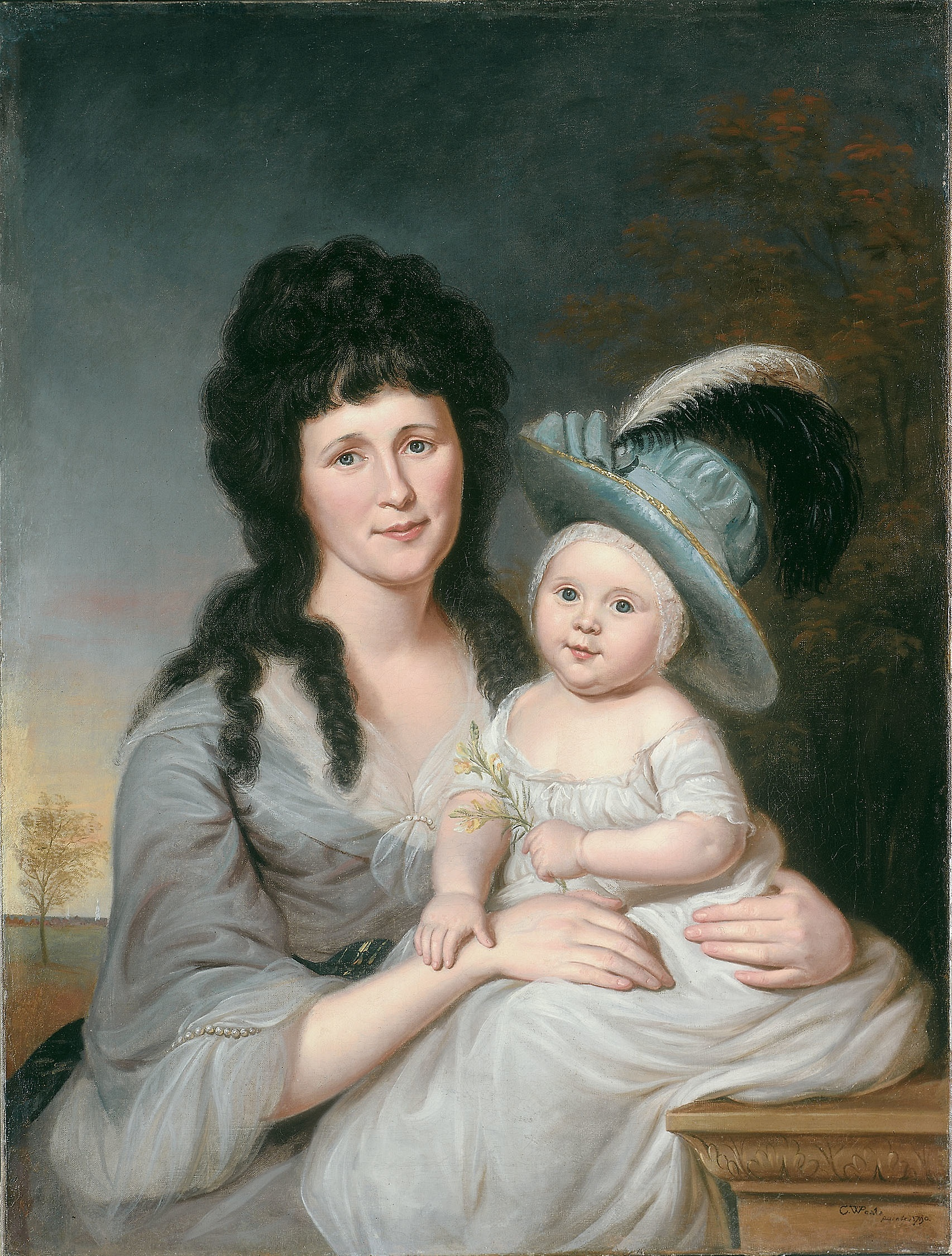
John Nicholson's wife, Hannah Duncan, and their infant son, John Nicholson Jr., in a portrait by Charles Willson Peale, 1790

Nicholson was married to Hannah Duncan. Together, they had a total of eight children. In 1790, Charles Willson Peale painted companion portraits of Nicholson and of Hannah with their infant son, John Jr., who later inherited the painting.

== Legacy ==
Nicholson's estate remained entangled for decades after his death. In 1843, Pennsylvania created a special "Nicholson Court of Pleas" to adjudicate the complex claims of creditors.

Several places in Pennsylvania were named in his honor, including the borough of Nicholson, Pennsylvania (incorporated 1875) and townships in both Wyoming County and Fayette County.

== See also ==
- Robert Morris (financier)
- James Greenleaf
- Nicholson, Pennsylvania
