= Old White Mill =

- U.S. National Register of Historic Places
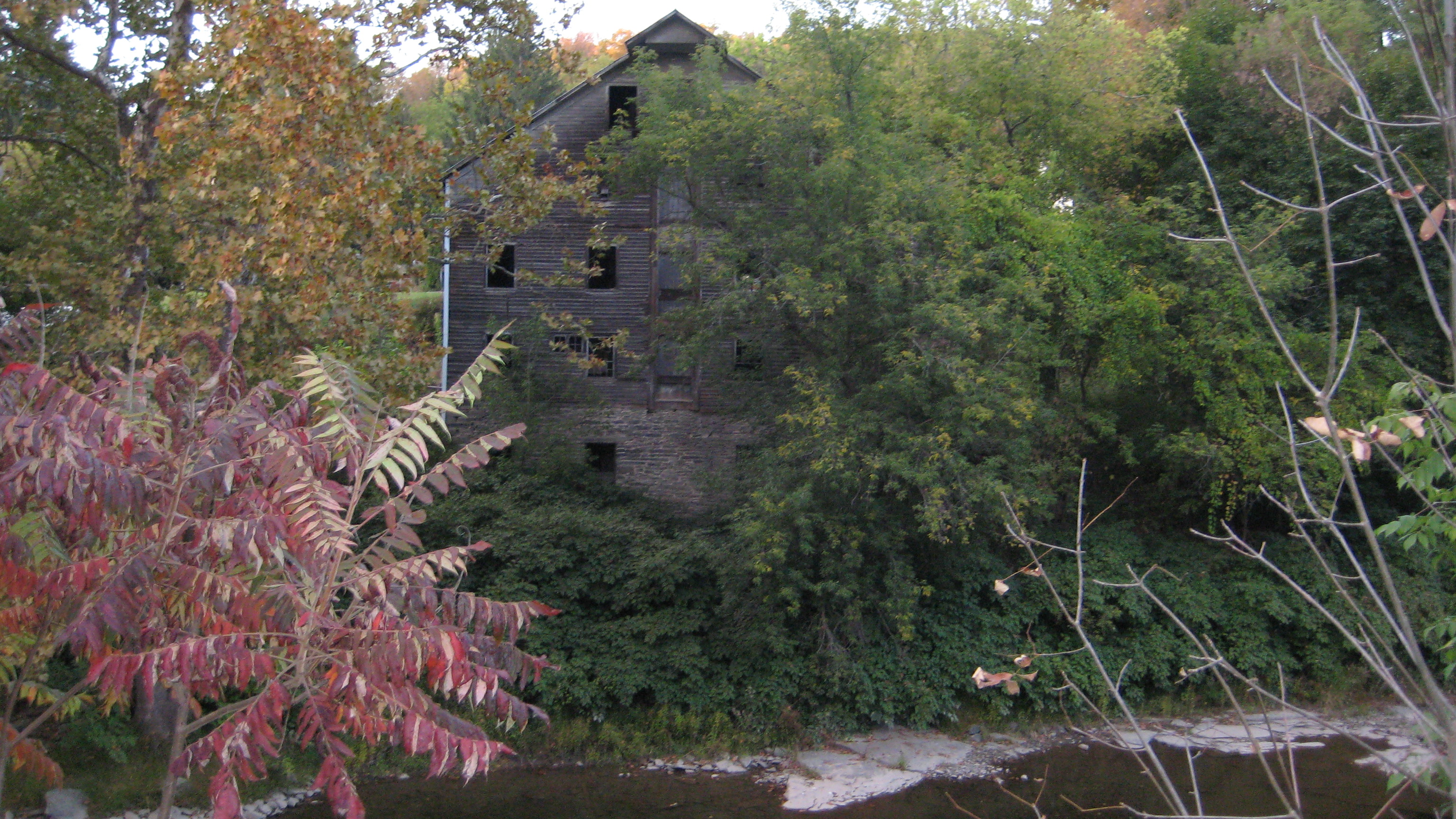

- Location within Pennsylvania Location within the United States
- Location: Off Welles St., Meshoppen, Pennsylvania
- Coordinates: 41°36′51″N 76°2′48″W
- Area: 0.6 acres (0.24 ha)
- Built: 1852
- Built by: Hollenback, G.M.; Et al.
- NRHP reference No.: 75001680
- Added to NRHP: September 11, 1975

The Old White Mill, also known as Sterling Mill and Pinnock Mill, is a historic grist mill located at Meshoppen, Wyoming County, Pennsylvania. It was built in 1852, and is a 5 1/2-story, banked frame structure. It measures 51 by 52 feet (16 by 16 m), sits on a stone foundation, and has a gable roof. It contains original milling equipment.

It was added to the National Register of Historic Places in 1975.
