= Noxen School =

- U.S. National Register of Historic Places
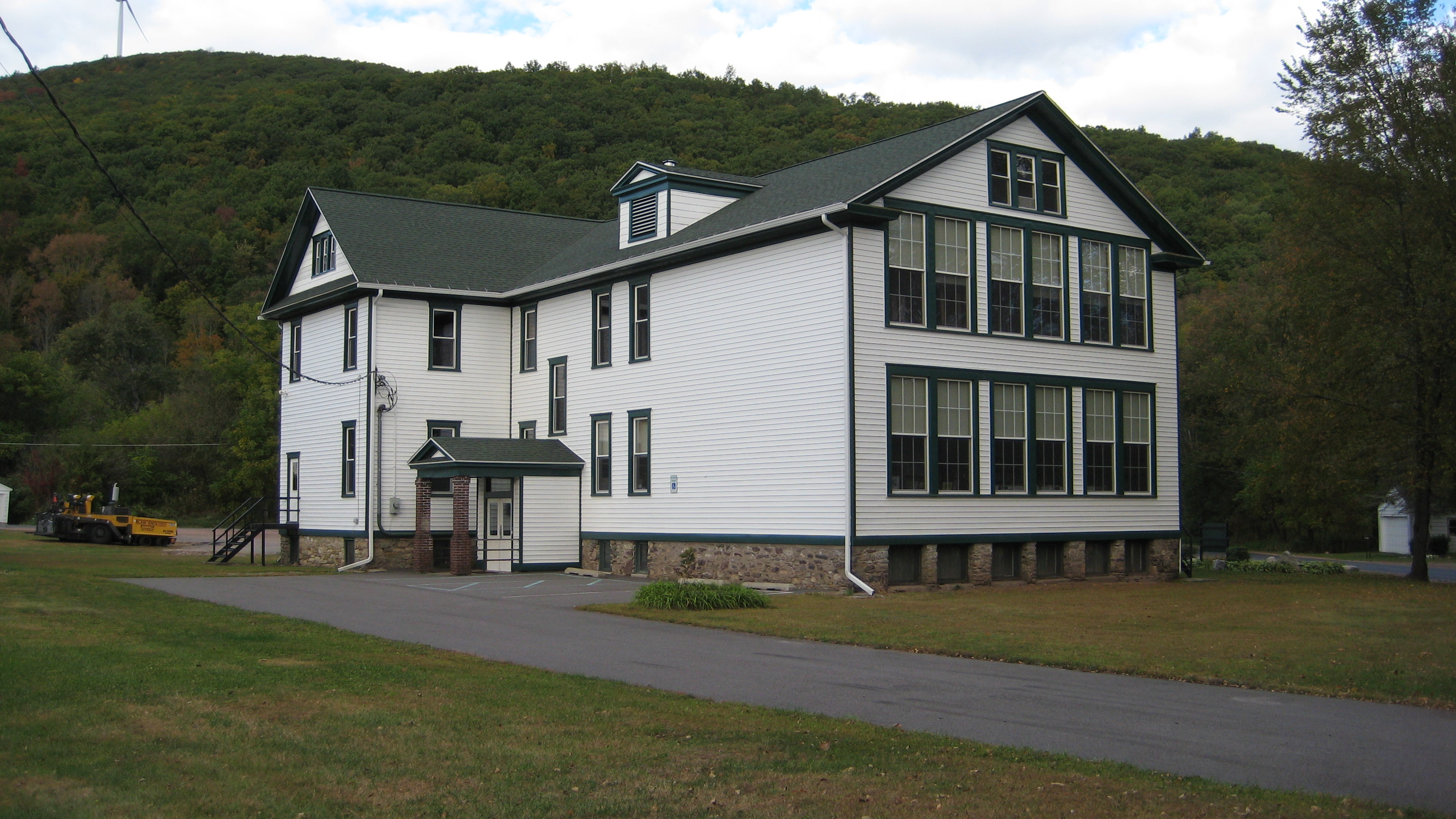

- Location within Pennsylvania Location within the United States
- Location: School St., Noxen Township, Pennsylvania
- Coordinates: 41°25′28″N 76°03′20″W
- Area: 1.8 acres (0.73 ha)
- Built: 1897, 1922
- Architect: Hubbell, William Sherman
- NRHP reference No.: 06000431
- Added to NRHP: May 24, 2006

The Noxen School, also known as Noxen High School, is an historic school building in Noxen Township, Wyoming County, Pennsylvania, United States.

It was added to the National Register of Historic Places in 2006.

== History an architectural features ==
The original section was built in 1897, and is a 2 1/2-story, T-shaped frame building. It has a two-classroom addition that was built in 1922. Originally established as a grade school, this structure was used as the community's high school from 1902 to 1951. It then housed an elementary school until it closed in 1976. It has since been used for a variety of commercial and institutional purposes.
