= Meshoppen Creek =

Watercourse in Pennsylvania, US

Coordinates: 41.62338°N 75.96681°W

Meshoppen Creek is a tributary of the Susquehanna River in Susquehanna and Wyoming counties, Pennsylvania, in the United States. It is approximately 30.6 miles (49.2 km) long and flows through Bridgewater Township, Dimock Township, and Springville Township in Susquehanna County and Lemon Township, Washington Township, Meshoppen Township, and Meshoppen in Wyoming County. The watershed of the creek has an area of 114 square miles (300 km^{2}). It is possible to canoe on 17.0 miles (27.4 km) of Meshoppen Creek.

== Course ==
Meshoppen Creek begins on a hill in Bridgewater Township, Susquehanna County. It heads downhill, flowing south-southeast for less than a mile before turning south-southwest. Eventually, the creek turns south and passes the community of Watrous Corners. Continuing south and slightly west for a few miles, it eventually flows roughly along the border between Bridgewater Township and Dimock Township. After a short distance, the creek completely enters Dimock Township and continues south and west for several more miles. In the southern edge of the township, it passes through a lake and receives the tributary Burdlick Creek. The creek then enters Springville Township. It continues southwest until it picks up the tributary Sevens Creek. It then briefly turns south before turning southwest again. The creek then begins meandering for a few miles, receiving the tributaries Pond Brook, Thomas Creek, and North Branch Meshoppen Creek. It then leaves Susquehanna County.

Upon leaving Susquehanna County, Meshoppen Creek enters Lemon Township, Wyoming County. It continues meandering southwest, crossing Pennsylvania Route 29, entering Washington Township and passing Valentine Hill. The creek then reaches Kaiserville and begins meandering west. The creek eventually enters Meshoppen Township. It almost immediately picks up West Branch Meshoppen Creek and turns south. After less than a mile, it turns west. A few miles later, it reaches the community of Meshoppen. In Meshoppen, it crosses U.S. Route 6 and reaches its confluence with the Susquehanna River.

Meshoppen Creek joins the Susquehanna River 234.44 miles (377.29 km) upstream of its mouth.

== Geography, geology, and climate ==
The elevation near the mouth of Meshoppen Creek is 617 feet (188 m) above sea level. The elevation of the creek's source is between 1,620 feet (490 m) and 1,640 feet (500 m).

A waterfall that is 20 feet (6.1 m) high is on Meshoppen Creek. Another waterfall is also situated on the creek near Meshoppen. There are wide, shallow riffles on the creek near State Route 3017. Large numbers of riffles and few pools area also found downstream of Pennsylvania Route 29.

The channel of Meshoppen Creek is sinuous. The creek flows through rock formations made of shale and sandstone. Additionally, glacial drift is present in the watershed.

The topography of the watershed of Meshoppen Creek is described as "rough and hilly" in a 1921 book. Steep but rounded hills are present in the watershed, as are forests and some swamps and lakes.

The rate of precipitation in the watershed of Meshoppen Creek ranges between 35 inches (89 cm) and 40 inches (100 cm) per year.

== Watershed ==
The watershed of Meshoppen Creek has an area of 114 square miles (300 km^{2}). The watershed is situated in southwestern Susquehanna County and northern Wyoming County. The creek's drainage basin is part of the Upper North Branch Susquehanna drainage basin.

Major lakes in the watershed of Meshoppen Creek include Schooleys Pond and Sound Pond. They have surface areas of 39.3 and 34 acres, respectively.

Meshoppen Creek flows through rural areas for much of its length. Groves of hemlock and hardwood trees are present in these areas, as are pastures. However, there is some development along the creek where it crosses State Route 3017.

A stream gauge is not present on Meshoppen Creek.

== Name, history and industries ==
Meshoppen is a name derived from a Native American language purported to mean "glass beads".

In the early 1900s, major industries in the watershed of Meshoppen Creek included agriculture, quarries, and sawmills. The creek was also used to power a flour mill in Meshoppen. The Lehigh Valley Railroad also went through the watershed in this time period and used the creek as a water supply.

In 1921, the largest communities in the watershed of Meshoppen Creek were Meshoppen and Springville. Their populations were 630 and 550, respectively.

== Recreation ==
A total of 17.0 miles (27.4 km) of Meshoppen Creek are possible to canoe on during snowmelt or within several days of heavy rain. Edward Gertler describes the scenery along the creek as "good to excellent" and also writes that the creek is an "awfully pretty little creek". The difficulty rating of the creek for canoeing mostly ranges from 1 to 3-, but there is a patch of class 6 rapids.

== See also ==
- Little Mehoopany Creek, next tributary of the Susquehanna River going downriver
- List of rivers of Pennsylvania
