= Tunkhannock Viaduct =

Railroad bridge in Pennsylvania, U.S.

Tunkhannock Creek Viaduct
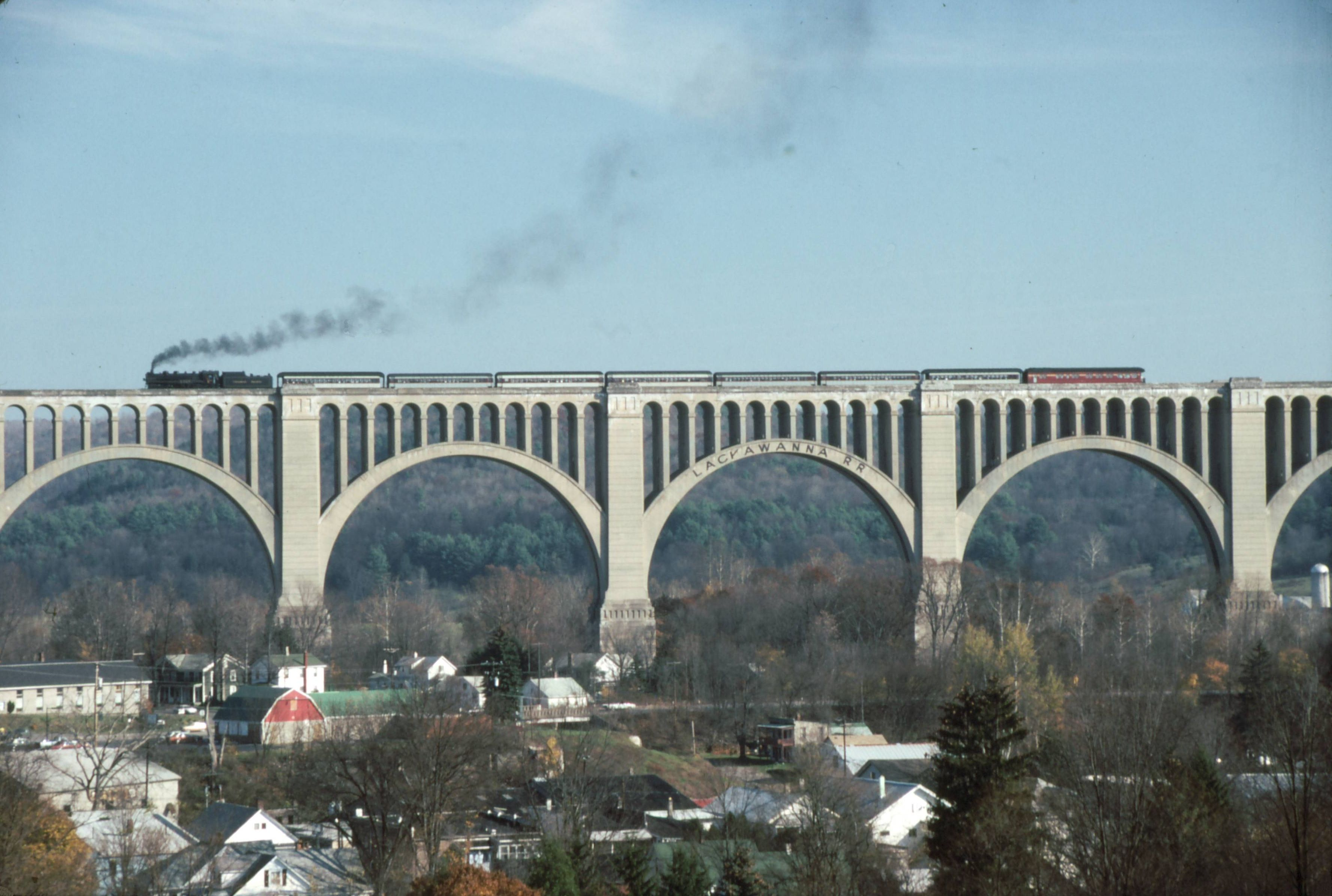
- A Steamtown National Historic Site excursion train crosses Tunkhannock Viaduct.
- Coordinates: 41°37′20″N 75°46′38″W
- Carries: railroad traffic
- Crosses: Tunkhannock Creek
- Locale: Nicholson, Pennsylvania, U.S.

Characteristics
- Design: Deck arch bridge
- Material: Concrete
- Total length: 2,375 feet (723.9 m)
- Longest span: 180 feet (54.9 m) each span
- No. of spans: 10 (11 piers)
- Clearance below: 240 feet (73.2 m)

Rail characteristics
- No. of tracks: 2
- Track gauge: 4 ft 8 1/2 in (1,435 mm) standard gauge
- Structure gauge: AAR for the width only overhead open or clear

History
- Designer: Abraham Burton Cohen
- Construction start: May 1912
- Opened: November 6, 1915
- Tunkhannock Creek Viaduct
- U.S. National Register of Historic Places
- Pennsylvania state historical marker
- Location within Pennsylvania
- Coordinates: 41°37′22″N 75°46′36″W
- Area: 3 acres (1.2 ha)
- Built: 1912-1915
- NRHP reference No.: 77001203

Significant dates
- Added to NRHP: April 11, 1977
- Designated PHMC: September 16, 1995

Location
- Interactive map of Tunkhannock Creek Viaduct

Tunkhannock Creek Viaduct (also known as the Nicholson Bridge and the Tunkhannock Viaduct) is a concrete deck arch bridge on the Nicholson Cutoff rail line segment of the Norfolk Southern Railway's Sunbury Line that spans Tunkhannock Creek in Nicholson, Pennsylvania.

Opened in 1915 by the Delaware, Lackawanna and Western Railroad (DL&W), the bridge is still used daily for regular through freight service.

The bridge measures 2,375 feet (724 m) long and towers 240 feet (73.15 m) above the creek bed; it stands 300 feet (91.44 m) above bedrock. It was the largest concrete structure in the world at its completion; a half-century later, it still merited "the title of largest concrete bridge in America, if not the world".

In 1975, the American Society of Civil Engineers designated the bridge as a National Historic Civil Engineering Landmark. The bridge was listed on the National Register of Historic Places on May 3, 1977.

== History ==
The DL&W built the viaduct as part of its 39.6-mile (63.7 km) Nicholson Cutoff, which replaced a winding and hilly section of the route between Scranton, Pennsylvania, and Binghamton, New York, reducing travel by 3.6 miles (5.8 km)—21 minutes of passenger train time or one hour of freight train time. The bridge was designed by the DL&W's Abraham Burton Cohen. Concrete sections of the bridge were designed by architect William Hull Botsford, a 1909 graduate of Cornell University. Botsford did not see the project to completion, as he perished in the sinking of the Titanic in April 1912. Other key DL&W staff were G. J. Ray, chief engineer; F. L. Wheaton, engineer of construction; and C. W. Simpson, resident engineer in charge of the construction. The contractor was Flickwir & Bush, including general manager F. M. Talbot and superintendent W. C. Ritner.

Construction on the bridge began in May 1912 by excavating all 11 bridge piers to bedrock, which was up to 138 feet (42 m) below ground. In total, excavation for the viaduct removed 13,318,000 cubic yards (10,182,000 m^{3}) of material, more than half of that rock.

Almost half of the bulk of the bridge is underground. At mid-construction, 80,000 cubic yards (61,000 m^{3}) of concrete had gone into its substructures, and it was estimated that construction would require 169,000 cubic yards (129,000 m^{3}) of concrete and 1,140 short tons (1,030 t; 1,020 long tons) of steel. The steel estimate proved accurate; the bridge ultimately used a bit less concrete than expected: 167,000 cubic yards (128,000 m^{3}), making the total weight about 670,000,000 pounds (300,000,000 kg).

The bridge was dedicated on November 6, 1915, along with the opening of the Nicholson Cutoff.

Construction photos along with a short history of the bridge were published by the Nicholson Area Library in a brochure in 1976. It was listed on the National Register of Historic Places on April 11, 1977.

Since 1990, the local community has celebrated the building of the bridge on the second Sunday of September with "Nicholson Bridge Day", a street fair, parade, and other activities. The 100th-anniversary celebration was held in September 2015.

== Recognition ==
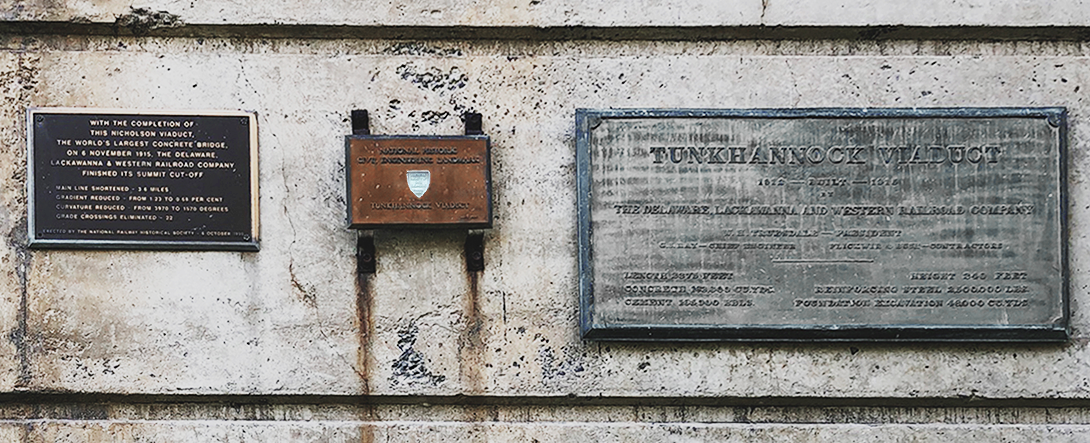
Photograph of the Delaware and Lackawanna dedication plaque in 1915 and ASCE civil engineering landmark (1976) and National Railroad history Society plaque (1990)

In 1975 the American Society of Civil Engineers or ASCE designated the bridge as a National Historic Civil Engineering Landmark. ASCE noted that at the time of its construction from 1912 to 1915, it was the largest reinforced concrete railroad bridge ever built.

ASCE recognized the bridge as "not only a great feat of construction skill" but also a "bold and successful departure from contemporary, conventional concepts of railroad location in that it carried a mainline transversely to the regional drainage pattern, effectively reducing the distance and grade impediments...". At the time, the decision was made to build the bridge out of reinforced concrete, railroad engineers had little experience with this material.

The bridge was also listed on the National Register of Historic Places on May 3, 1977. In 1990, the National Railway Historical Society placed a historical plaque on the structure noting its size as the world's largest concrete bridge, completing the Summit cut-off project for the Delaware, Lackawanna and Western Railroad.

In June 2026, Union Pacific Big Boy No. 4014, the largest and heaviest steam locomotive still in operation, crossed the bridge on its coast-to-coast heritage excursion with Union Pacific and Norfolk Southern units and passenger coaches in tow.

== Gallery ==
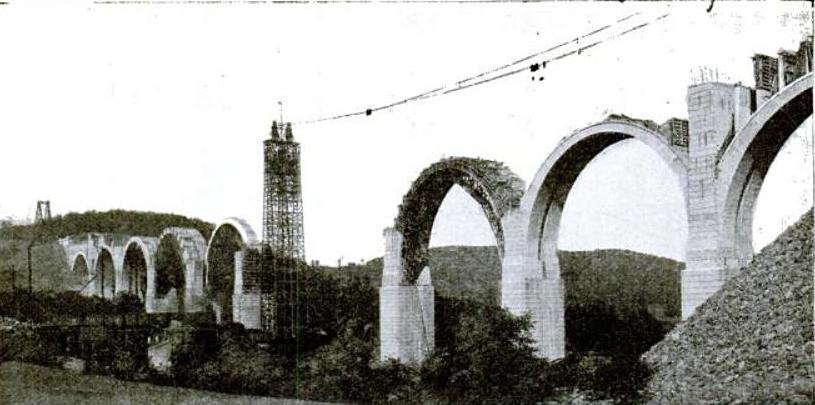
Tunkhannock Viaduct under construction in 1914

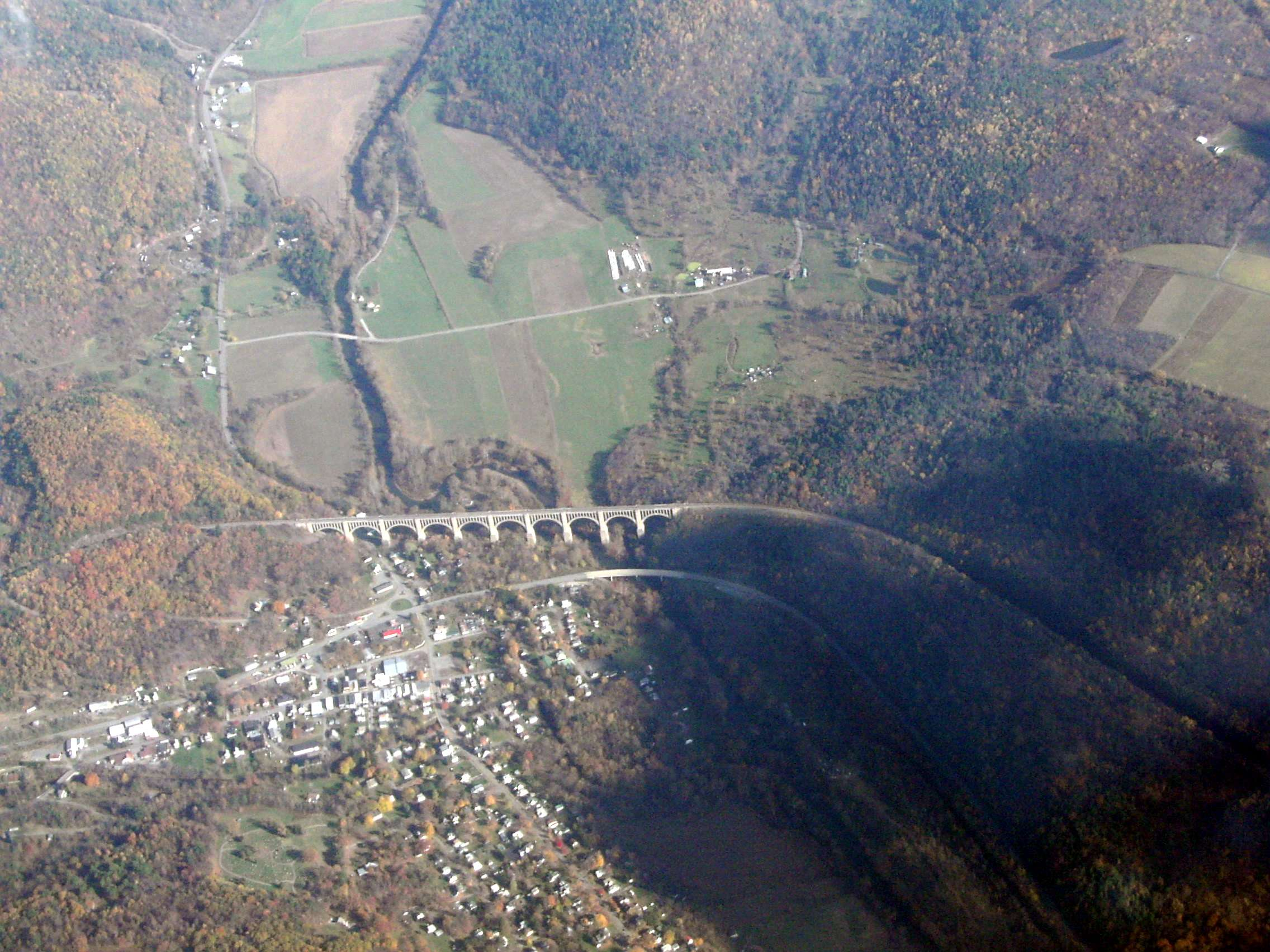
Tunkhannock Viaduct from the air

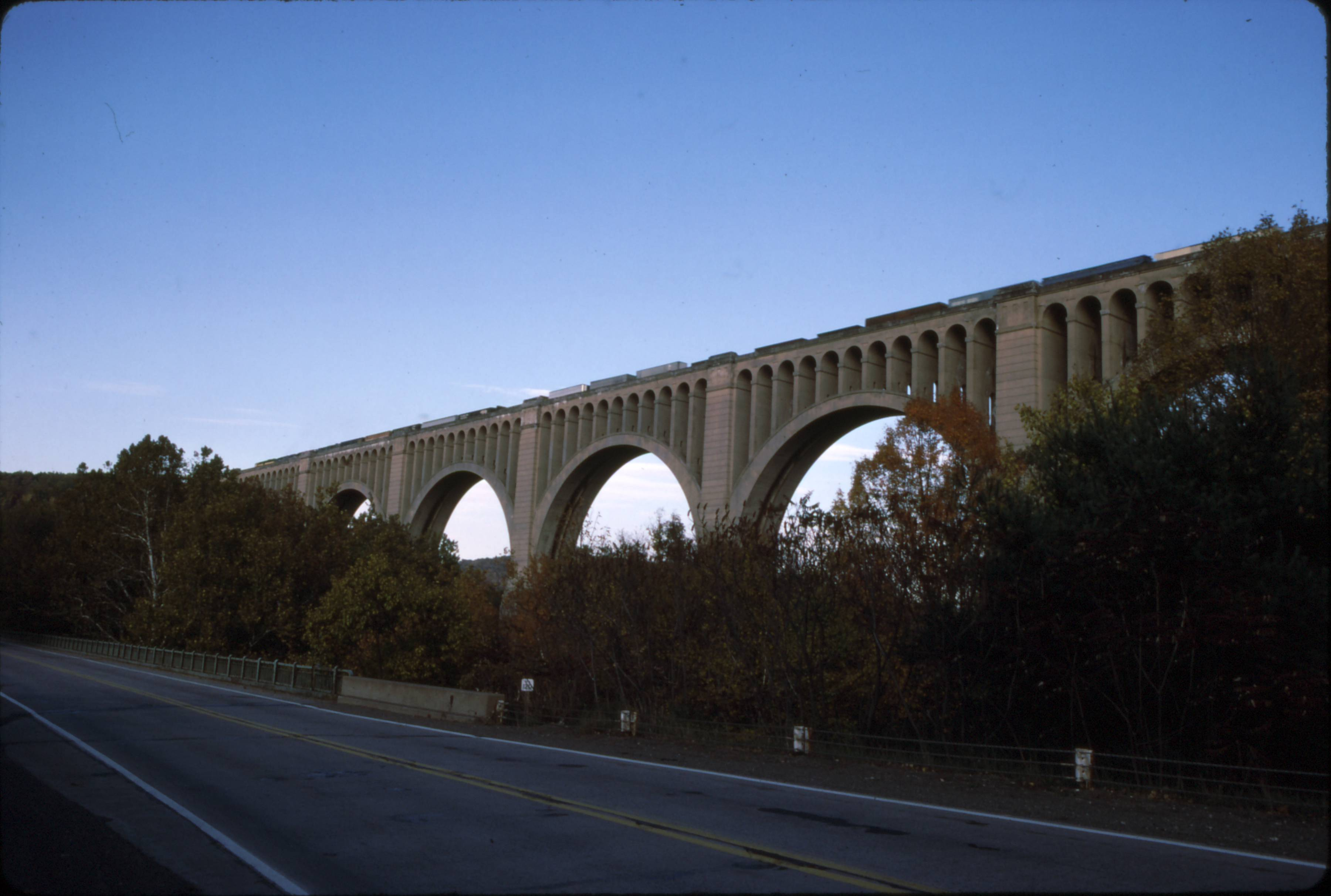
Tunkhannock Viaduct, as seen from Route 11

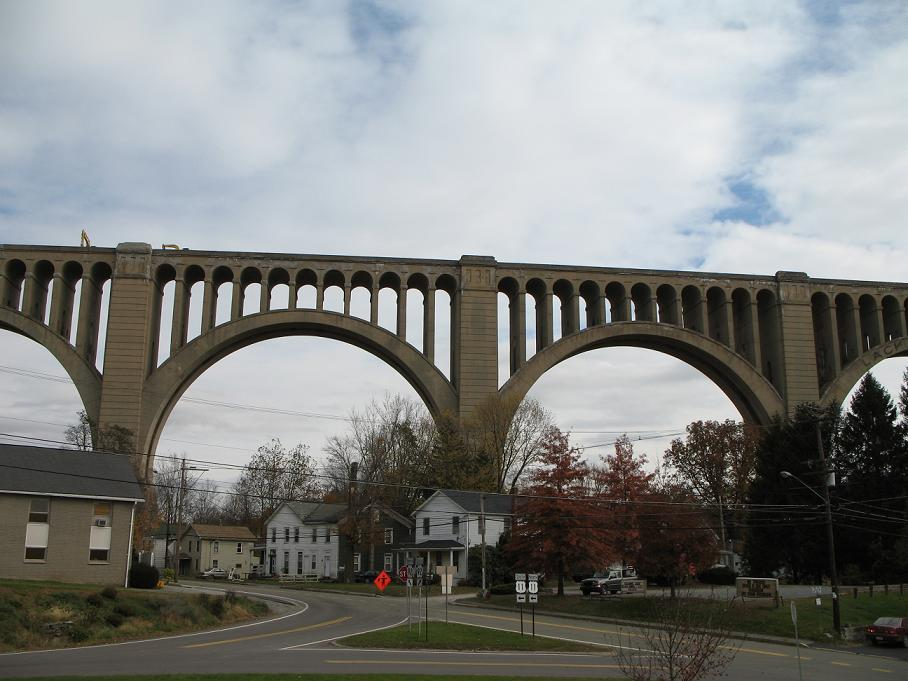
Viaduct over Nicholson, Pa.

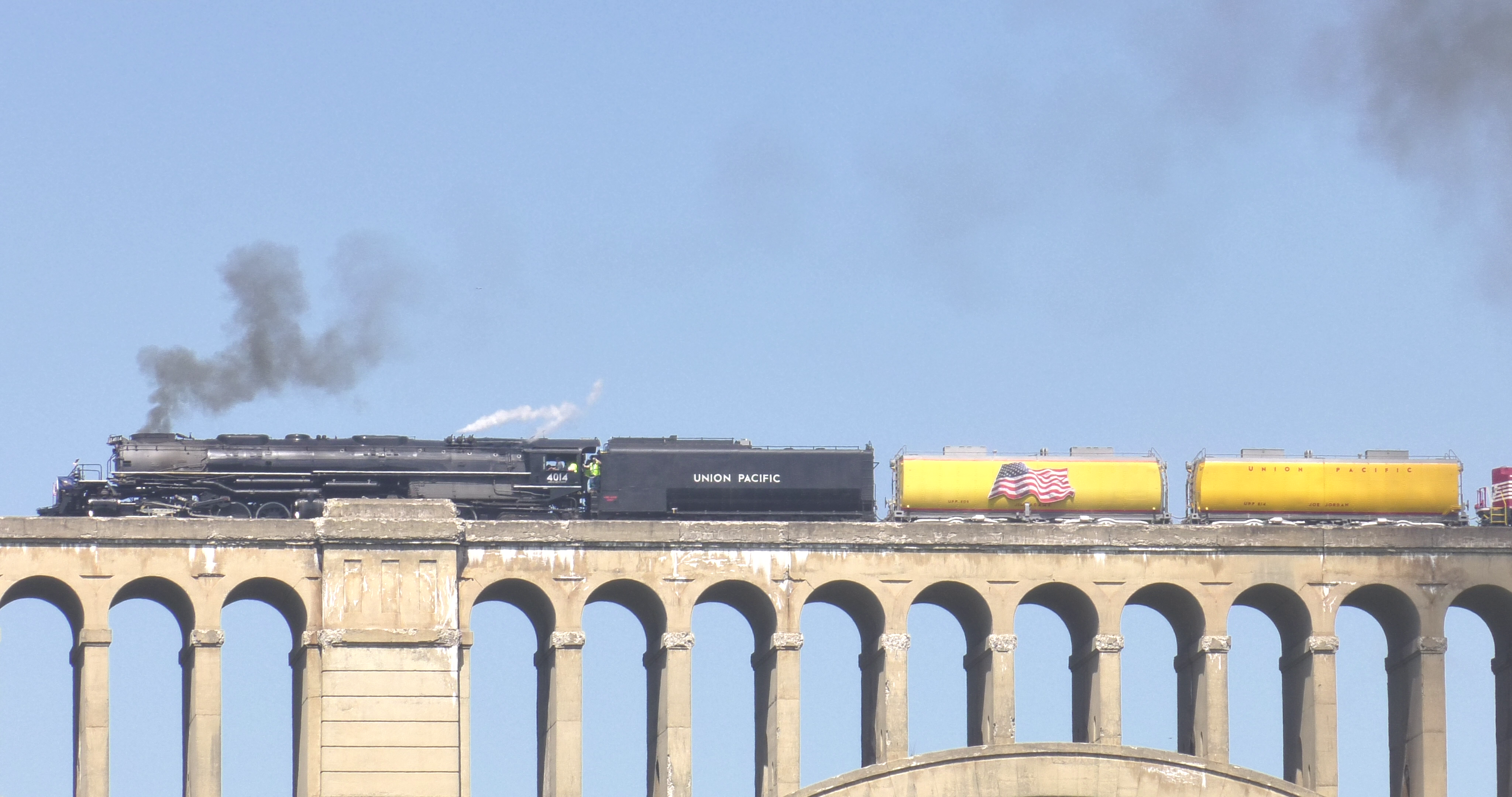
UP 4014 gets under way after pausing on the Viaduct for the thousands of fans in attendance to get pictures.

== See also ==
- Starrucca Viaduct
- Lackawanna Cut-Off
- List of bridges documented by the Historic American Engineering Record in Pennsylvania
- National Register of Historic Places listings in Wyoming County, Pennsylvania
