= Meshoppen Township, Pennsylvania =

Township in Pennsylvania, US

Meshoppen Township
- Township
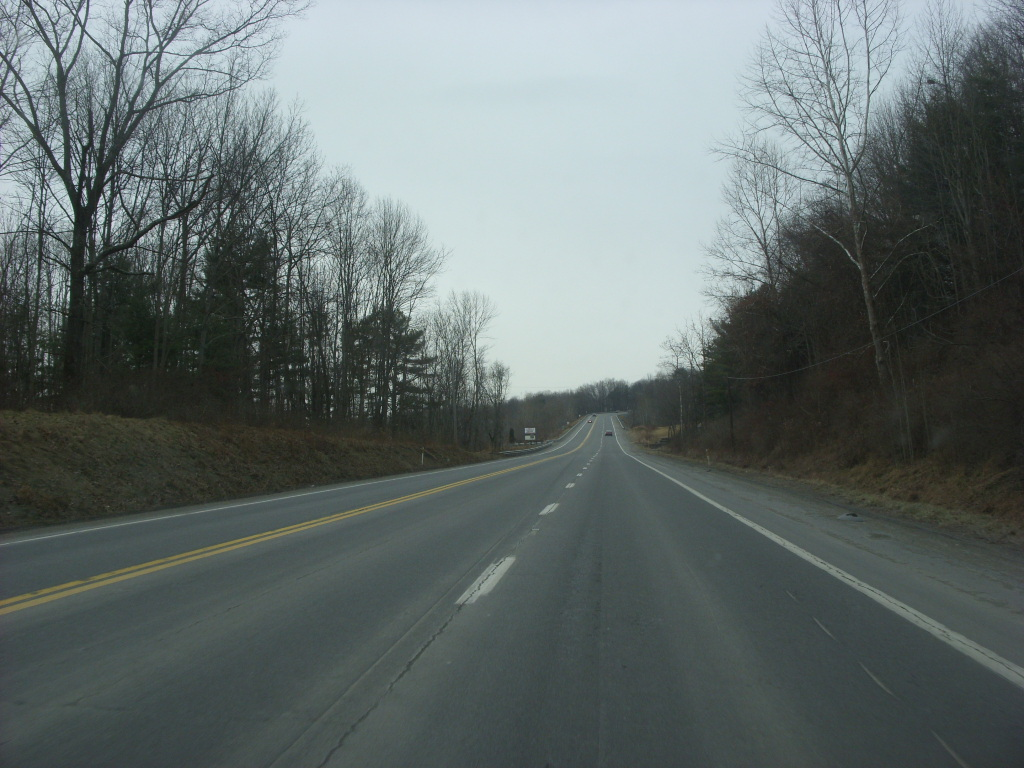
- Westbound US 6 in Meshoppen Township

- Location of Pennsylvania in the United States
- Coordinates: 41°37′00″N 76°04′59″W
- Country: United States
- State: Pennsylvania
- County: Wyoming

Area
  - Total: 16.10 sq mi (41.71 km^{2})
  - Land: 15.71 sq mi (40.69 km^{2})
  - Water: 0.39 sq mi (1.02 km^{2})
- Elevation: 994 ft (303 m)

Population (2020)
  - Total: 935 ▼
  - Estimate (2021): 932
  - Density: 64.9/sq mi (25.07/km^{2})
- Time zone: UTC-5 (EST)
  - Summer (DST): UTC-4 (EDT)
- Area code: 570
- FIPS code: 42-131-48864

Meshoppen Township is a township in Wyoming County, Pennsylvania, United States. The population was 935 at the 2020 census.

The township takes its name from Meshoppen Creek, a Native American name purported to mean "glass beads".

== Geography ==
According to the United States Census Bureau, the township has a total area of 16.1 square miles (42 km^{2}), of which 15.7 square miles (41 km^{2}) is land and 0.4 square miles (1.0 km^{2}) or 2.48% water.

== Demographics ==
Historical population
Census	Pop.	Note	%±
2010	1,073		—
2020	935		−12.9%
2021 (est.)	932		−0.3%
U.S. Decennial Census

As of the census of 2010, there were 1,073 people, 429 households, and 271 families residing in the township. The population density was 68.3 inhabitants per square mile (26.4/km^{2}). There were 554 housing units at an average density of 35.3 units per square mile (13.6 units/km^{2}). The racial makeup of the township was 97.7% White, 0.5% African American, 0.1% Native American, 0.2% Asian, 0.85% from other races, and 0.65% from two or more races. Hispanic or Latino of any race were 1.4% of the population.

There were 429 households, out of which 34.3% had children under the age of 18 living with them, 44.1% were married couples living together, 11.7% had a female householder with no husband present, and 36.8% were non-families. 29.4% of all households were made up of individuals, and 10.9% had someone living alone who was 65 years of age or older. The average household size was 2.50 and the average family size was 3.06.

In the township the population was spread out, with 26.1% under the age of 18, 62% from 18 to 64, and 11.9% who were 65 years of age or older. The median age was 38 years.

The median income for a household in the township was $41,765, and the median income for a family was $46,667. Males had a median income of $32,566 versus $24,671 for females. The per capita income for the township was $19,146. About 10.6% of families and 16.6% of the population were below the poverty line, including 19.6% of those under age 18 and 17.8% of those age 65 or over.
