= Nicholson, Pennsylvania =

Borough in Pennsylvania, US

Borough of Nicholson
- Borough
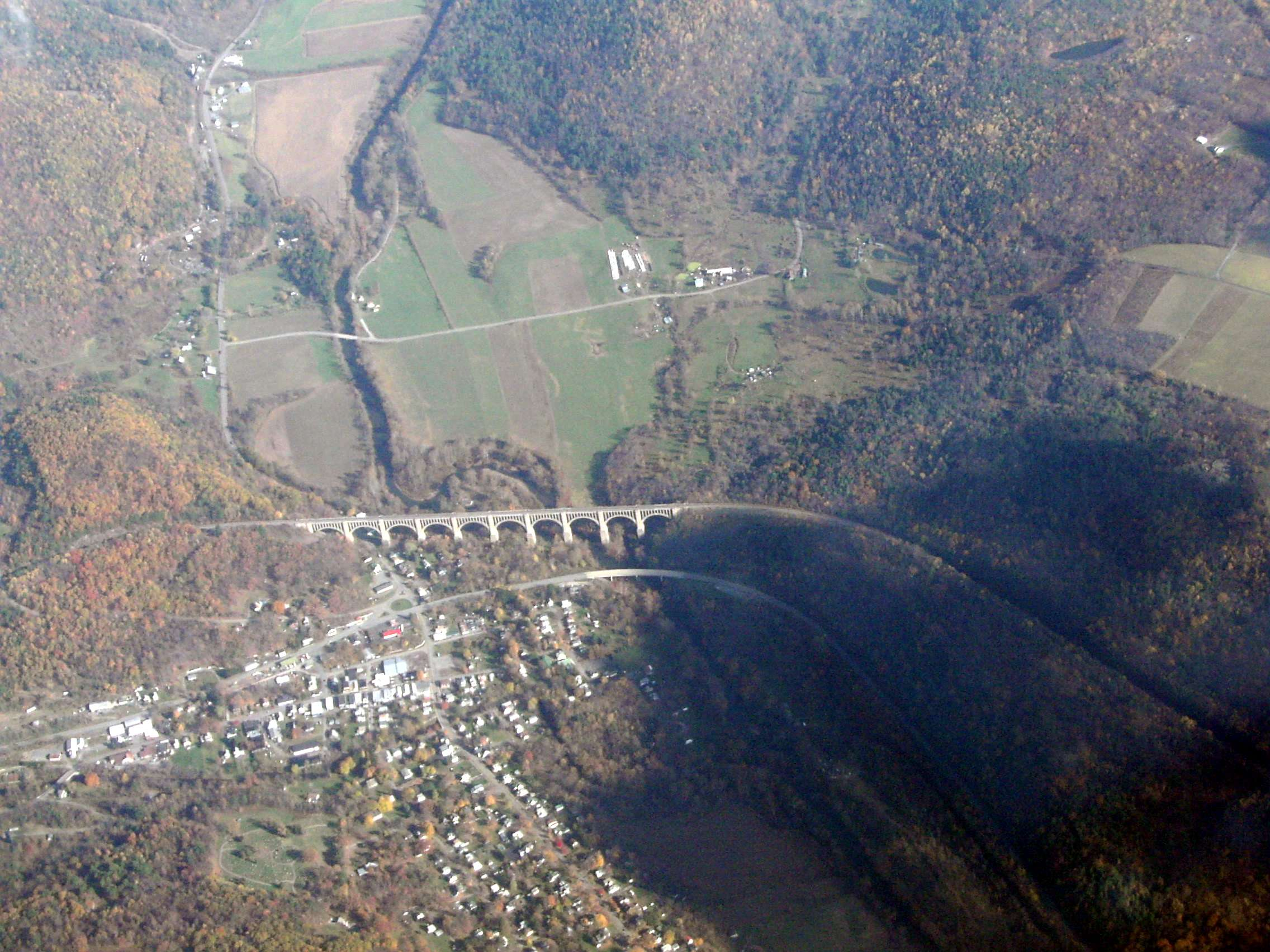
- Aerial view of Nicholson and Tunkhannock Viaduct
- Motto: Population 1,000. Hospitality for 1,000,000
- Location of Nicholson in Wyoming County, Pennsylvania

- Location of Nicholson in Pennsylvania Nicholson (the United States)
- Coordinates: 41°37′30″N 75°46′59″W
- Country: United States
- State: Pennsylvania
- County: Wyoming
- Founded: August 23, 1875

Government
  - Mayor: Charles H. Litwin Jr.
  - Council President: Dawn Bell

Area
  - Total: 1.17 sq mi (3.04 km^{2})
  - Land: 1.16 sq mi (3.00 km^{2})
  - Water: 0.015 sq mi (0.04 km^{2})
- Elevation: 728 ft (222 m)

Population (2020)
  - Total: 696
  - Density: 600.9/sq mi (231.99/km^{2})
- Time zone: UTC-5 (EST)
  - Summer (DST): UTC-4 (EDT)
- ZIP Code: 18446
- Area code: 570
- FIPS code: 42-54400
- Website: www.nicholsonpa.info

Nicholson is a borough in Wyoming County, Pennsylvania. The population was 698 at the 2020 census.

== History ==
The borough of Nicholson was incorporated on August 23, 1875 and was named after John Nicholson, who had been Pennsylvania's comptroller general in the late 1700s.

The town of Nicholson attracted national attention during the final week of July 1986, when an escaped Bengal tiger was hunted in the area for several days. Despite air and ground searches by state police and zoo officials, the animal was never found.

== Geography ==
Nicholson is located at 41°37′30″N 75°46′59″W (41.624983, -75.783054). According to the U.S. Census Bureau, the borough has a total area of 1.2 square miles (3.1 km^{2}), of which 1.2 square miles (3.1 km^{2}) is land and 0.01 square miles (0.026 km^{2}) (0.83%) is water.

== Demographics ==
Historical population
Census	Pop.	Note	%±
1880	586		—
1890	734		25.3%
1900	893		21.7%
1910	852		−4.6%
1920	842		−1.2%
1930	932		10.7%
1940	731		−21.6%
1950	569		−22.2%
1960	686		20.6%
1970	877		27.8%
1980	945		7.8%
1990	857		−9.3%
2000	713		−16.8%
2010	767		7.6%
2020	696		−9.3%
2021 (est.)	697	▲	0.1%

As of the census of 2010, there were 767 people, 302 households, and 195 families residing in the borough. The population density was 639.2 inhabitants per square mile (246.8/km^{2}). There were 343 housing units at an average density of 285.8 per square mile (110.3/km^{2}). The racial makeup of the borough was 97% White, 0.1% African American, 0.1% Native American, 0.1% Pacific Islander, 0.1% some other race, and 2.5% from two or more races. Hispanic or Latino of any race were 1.4% of the population.

There were 302 households, out of which 29.1% had children under the age of 18 living with them, 48.7% were married couples living together, 11.3% had a female householder with no husband present, and 35.4% were non-families. 28.5% of all households were made up of individuals, and 16.9% had someone living alone who was 65 years of age or older. The average household size was 2.54 and the average family size was 3.15.

In the borough, the population was spread out, with 25% under the age of 18, 58.3% from 18 to 64, and 16.7% who were 65 years of age or older. The median age was 37 years.

The median income for a household in the borough was $38,650, and the median income for a family was $40,833. Males had a median income of $38,889 versus $27,813 for females. The per capita income for the borough was $21,449. About 24% of families and 24.8% of the population were below the poverty line, including 41% of those under age 18 and 10.5% of those age 65 or over.

== Government ==
The town has a weak mayor - strong council form of government.

=== Mayor ===
Charles Litwin Jr.	Republican

=== Council ===
Council Member	Term Expires	Party
Nathan Harpster	2025	Democratic
John Kiryluk	2025	Republican
John Decker	2025	Republican
Albert Olive	2023	Republican
Joan Irion Jenkins	2025	Republican
David Noakes	2023	Republican
John Bower	2023	Republican

== Tunkhannock Viaduct ==
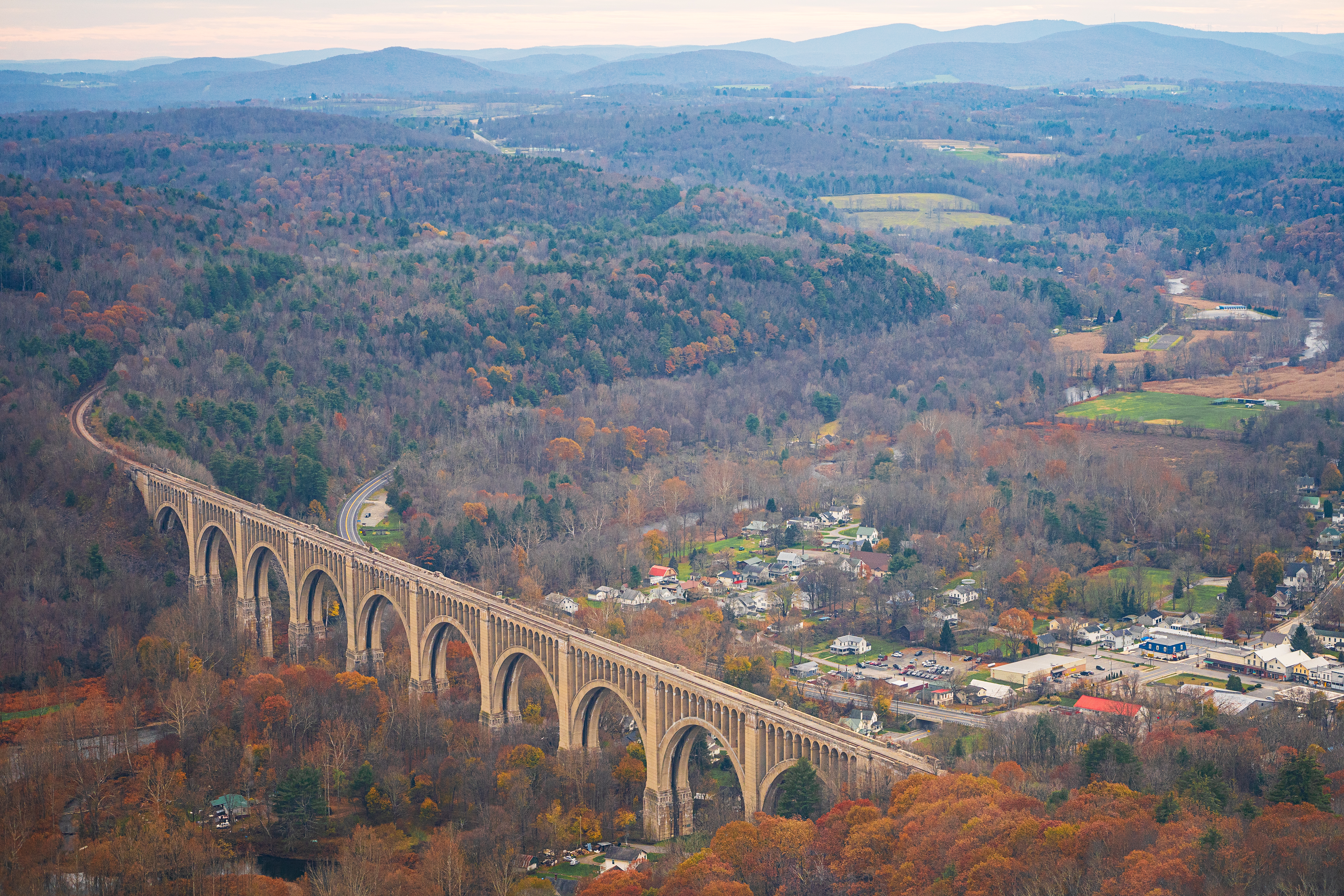
Aerial view of the Tunkhannock Viaduct

A local landmark, the Tunkhannock Viaduct, Tunkhannock Creek Viaduct or "Nicholson Bridge" has been a focal point of the Nicholson community since its completion in 1915. Built by the Delaware, Lackawanna & Western Railroad between 1912 and 1915, the bridge has served many owners: DL&W, Erie Lackawanna, Conrail, Delaware & Hudson [also operated by Guilford Transportation, and New York Susquehanna & Western] before the current owner, Norfolk Southern Railway. Norfolk Southern trains operate over it daily between Binghamton and several other New York state locations, along with rail yards in Pennsylvania such as Scranton, Allentown and Harrisburg. Each year the town organizes a festival in honor of the bridge called Nicholson Bridge Day. The entire main street of the town is shut down and filled with vendors, entertainment, and more.

== Notable people ==
- Jim Saxton, former Representative, New Jersey 3rd Congressional District
- Don Sherwood, former Representative, Pennsylvania 10th Congressional District
