= Meshoppen, Pennsylvania =

Borough in Pennsylvania, US

Borough of Meshoppen
- Borough
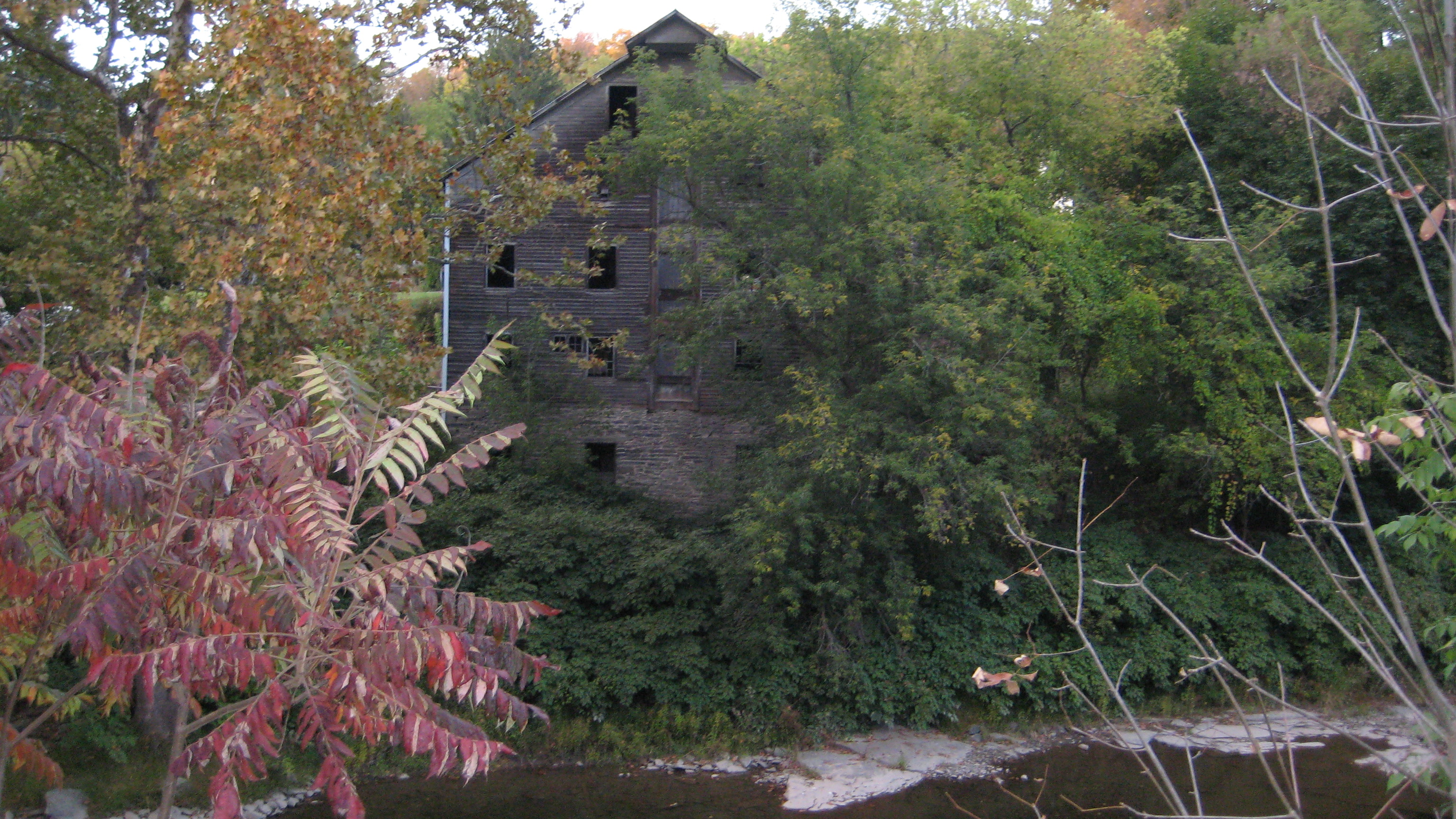
- Meshoppen's Old White Mill

- Location of Meshoppen in Wyoming County, Pennsylvania.

- Location of Meshoppen in Pennsylvania Meshoppen (the United States)
- Coordinates: 41°36′53″N 76°02′47″W
- Country: United States
- State: Pennsylvania
- County: Wyoming
- Founder: A Sterling

Government
  - Mayor: Chris R. Baker

Area
  - Total: 0.77 sq mi (2.00 km^{2})
  - Land: 0.69 sq mi (1.79 km^{2})
  - Water: 0.081 sq mi (0.21 km^{2})
- Elevation: 623 ft (190 m)

Population (2020)
  - Total: 326
  - Density: 472.1/sq mi (182.27/km^{2})
- Time zone: UTC-5 (EST)
  - Summer (DST): UTC-4 (EDT)
- ZIP Code: 18630
- Area code: 570
- FIPS code: 42-48856

Meshoppen is a borough that is located in Wyoming County, Pennsylvania, United States. The population was 326 at the time of the 2020 census.

== History ==
The borough takes its name from Meshoppen Creek, a Native American name purported to mean "glass beads."

The Old White Mill was listed on the National Register of Historic Places in 1975.

== Geography ==
According to the United States Census Bureau, the borough has a total area of 0.7 square miles (1.8 km^{2}), all land.

== Demographics ==
Historical population
| Census | Pop. | Note | %± |
|---|---|---|---|
| 1880 | 554 | | — |
| 1890 | 597 | | 7.8% |
| 1900 | 609 | | 2.0% |
| 1910 | 630 | | 3.4% |
| 1920 | 608 | | −3.5% |
| 1930 | 525 | | −13.7% |
| 1940 | 580 | | 10.5% |
| 1950 | 574 | | −1.0% |
| 1960 | 470 | | −18.1% |
| 1970 | 482 | | 2.6% |
| 1980 | 571 | | 18.5% |
| 1990 | 439 | | −23.1% |
| 2000 | 459 | | 4.6% |
| 2010 | 563 | | 22.7% |
| 2020 | 326 | | −42.1% |
| 2021 (est.) | 327 | ▲ | 0.3% |

As of the census of 2010, there were 563 people, 190 households, and 128 families residing in the borough.

The population density was 804.3 inhabitants per square mile (310.5/km^{2}). There were 217 housing units at an average density of 310 per square mile (120/km^{2}).

The racial makeup of the borough was 89.2% White, 3.7% African American, 0.65% Native American, 0.65% Asian, 4.3% from other races, and 1.4% from two or more races. Hispanic or Latino of any race were 10.1% of the population.

There were 190 households, out of which 46.3% had children under the age of eighteen living with them; 38.9% were married couples living together, 18.9% had a female householder with no husband present, and 32.6% were non-families. 23.7% of all households were made up of individuals, and 5.8% had someone living alone who was sixty-five years of age or older. The average household size was 2.96 and the average family size was 3.46.

Within the borough, the population was spread out, with 31.4% of residents who were under the age of eighteen, 61.7% who were aged eighteen to sixty-four, and 6.9% who were sixty-five years of age or older. The median age was twenty-nine years.

The median income for a household in the borough was $40,714, and the median income for a family was $38,594. Males had a median income of $30,417 compared with that of $22,063 for females.

The per capita income for the borough was $16,588.

Approximately 13.5% of families and 22.7% of the population were living below the poverty line, including 37.2% of those who were under the age of eighteen and 15% of those who were aged sixty-five or older.

== Government ==
=== Mayor ===
| Bruce Marshall | Republican |

=== Council ===
| Council Member | Party |
|---|---|
| Herb Bevan | Republican |
| John V. Bunnell | Democratic |
| Michael Vorhees | Republican |
| Mike Loyd | Democratic |
| Bruce Priestner | Republican |
| Doris Pickett | Republican |
| Jack Vaow | Republican |

== Gallery ==
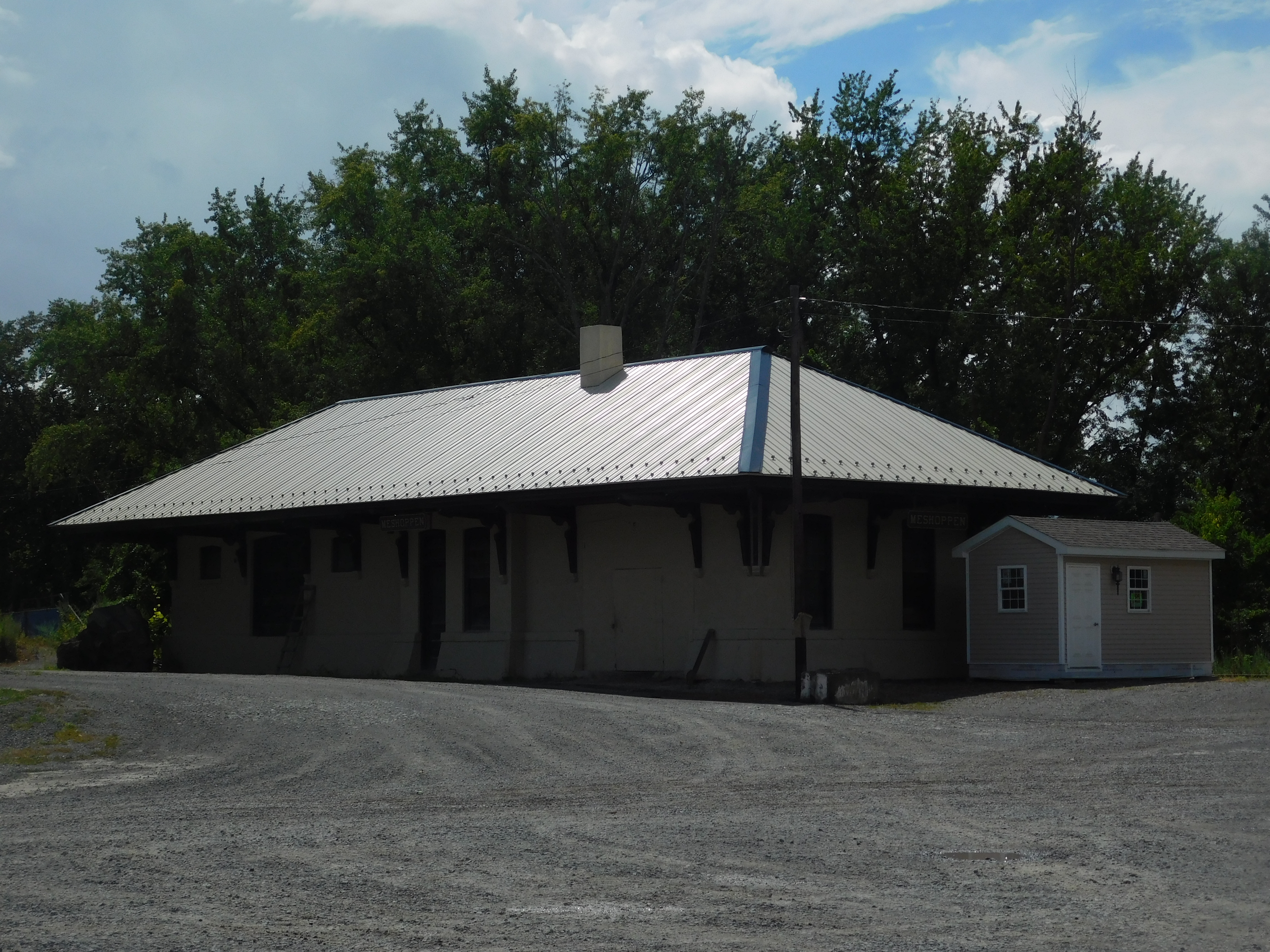
Former Lehigh Valley Railroad, Meshoppen
