= Dymond Creek =

Physical characteristics
- Source
  - location: valley in Franklin Township, Luzerne County, Pennsylvania
  - elevation: between 980 and 1,000 feet (299 and 305 m)
- Mouth
  - location: Susquehanna River in Exeter Township, Luzerne County, Pennsylvania
  - coordinates: 41°24′56″N 75°49′58″W
  - elevation: 551 ft (168 m)
- Length: 3.3 mi (5.3 km)
- Basin size: 2.24 mi^{2} (5.8 km^{2})

Basin features
- Progression: Susquehanna River → Chesapeake Bay

Dymond Creek is a tributary of the Susquehanna River in Luzerne County, Pennsylvania, in the United States. It is approximately 3.3 miles (5.3 km) long and flows through Franklin Township and Exeter Township. The watershed of the creek has an area of 2.24 square miles (5.8 km^{2}). The creek is not designated as impaired and its drainage basin is a Coldwater Fishery and a Migratory Fishery. The surficial geology in its vicinity consists of Wisconsinan Till, Wisconsinan Outwash, Wisconsinan Ice-Contact Stratified Drift, alluvium, alluvial fan, and bedrock.

== Course ==
Dymond Creek begins in a valley in Franklin Township. It flows east for a short distance before turning northeast and entering Exeter Township and the census-designated place of Upper Exeter. The creek then passes through a small lake and turns east for several tenths of a mile before turning northeast for several tenths of a mile. After that, it gradually turns east and then south-southeast. Several tenths of a mile further downstream, the creek turns east-northeast, leaves its valley, and crosses Pennsylvania Route 92. After a few tenths of a mile, it reaches its confluence with the Susquehanna River.

Dymond Creek joins the Susquehanna River 204.98 miles (329.88 km) upstream of its mouth.

== Hydrology, geography and geology ==
The elevation near the mouth of Dymond Creek is 551 feet (168 m) above sea level. The elevation of the creek's source is between 980 and 1,000 feet (299 and 305 m) above sea level.

The surficial geology in the vicinity of Dymond Creek consists mainly of a till known as Wisconsinan Till, alluvium, Wisconsinan Ice-Contact Stratified Drift, and bedrock containing sandstone, conglomeratic sandstone, shale, and coal. However, Wisconsinan Outwash containing stratified sand and gravel occurs near the creek's mouth and there are a few patches of alluvial fan near the lower and middle reaches.

The entire length of Dymond Creek attains its designated uses and thus is not designated as an impaired waterbody.

== Watershed and biology ==
The watershed of Dymond Creek has an area of 2.24 square miles (5.8 km^{2}). The mouth of the creek is in the United States Geological Survey quadrangle of Ransom. However, its source is in the quadrangle of Center Moreland.

There are possible problem areas with regards to flooding on Dymond Creek. However, a feasibility study on mitigating this hazard is ranked as low-priority in the Bi-County Hazard Mitigation Plan created for Luzerne County and Lackawanna County.

The drainage basin of Dymond Creek is designated as a Coldwater Fishery and a Migratory Fishery. The designated use of the creek is aquatic life.

== History ==
Dymond Creek was entered into the Geographic Names Information System on August 2, 1979. Its identifier in the Geographic Names Information System is 1198683.

== See also ==
- Sutton Creek (Susquehanna River), next tributary of the Susquehanna River going downriver
- List of rivers of Pennsylvania
