= Sutton Creek (Susquehanna River tributary) =

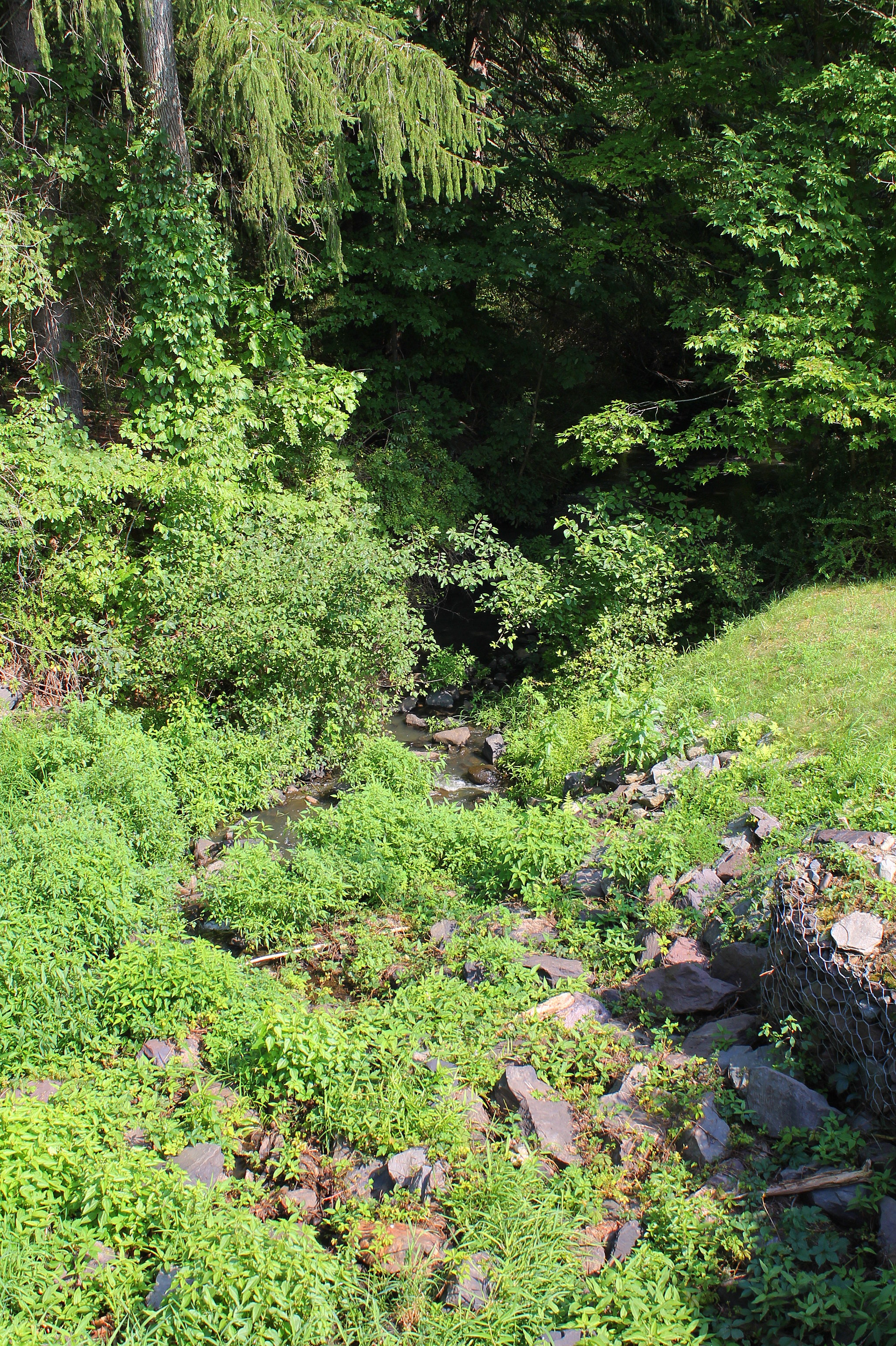
- Sutton Creek looking downstream below Lake Louise

Physical characteristics
- Source
  - location: valley in Dallas Township, Luzerne County, Pennsylvania
  - elevation: between 1,160 and 1,180 feet (350 and 360 m)
- Mouth
  - location: Susquehanna River in Exeter Township, Luzerne County, Pennsylvania
  - coordinates: 41°23′30″N 75°49′41″W
  - elevation: 545 ft (166 m)
- Length: 7.6 mi (12.2 km)
- Basin size: 11.6 mi^{2} (30 km^{2})

Basin features
- Progression: Susquehanna River → Chesapeake Bay
- Tributaries
  - left: Cider Run

Sutton Creek is a tributary of the Susquehanna River in Luzerne County, Pennsylvania, in the United States. It is approximately 7.6 miles (12.2 km) long and flows through Dallas Township, Franklin Township, and Exeter Township. The watershed of the creek has an area of 11.6 square miles (30 km^{2}). The creek has one named tributary, which is known as Cider Run. Sutton Creek is located a few miles upriver of the Wyoming Valley. The surficial geology in its watershed consists of alluvium, Wisconsinan Till, Wisconsinan Ice-Contact Stratified Drift, and bedrock, while the bedrock geology consists of sandstone.

Major land uses in the watershed of Sutton Creek include forested land and agricultural land. Lakes in the creek's watershed include Lake Louise and Cummings Pond. A number of gristmills and sawmills have been built on the creek in Franklin Township and Exeter Township. The Elisha Atherton Coray Mill, which operated along the banks of the creek, is on the Historic American Buildings Survey. The creek's watershed is designated as a Coldwater Fishery and a Migratory Fishery and the creek was historically stocked with trout. Many macroinvertebrate taxa have been observed on the creek.

== Course ==
Sutton Creek begins in a valley in Dallas Township. It flows east-southeast and east-northeast for several tenths of a mile, passing through two lakes and entering Franklin Township. The creek then turns east-southeast for several tenths of a mile and passes through Lake Louise. From the eastern end of the lake, the creek flows east-southeast for a few tenths of a mile before turning northeast. Several tenths of a mile further downstream, it turns southeast for several tenths of a mile before turning northeast for more than a mile. In this reach, it receives Cider Run, its only named tributary, from the left, and turns east. After a few tenths of a mile, the creek enters Exeter Township, where it turns southeast and then east-northeast. The creek then meanders southeast for some distance before turning north-northeast and crossing Pennsylvania Route 92. It then turns east and reaches its confluence with the Susquehanna River several hundred feet further downstream.

Sutton Creek joins the Susquehanna River 203.30 miles (327.18 km) upriver of its mouth.

=== Tributaries ===
Sutton Creek has one named tributary, which is known as Cider Run. Cider Run joins Sutton Creek 3.22 miles (5.18 km) upstream of its mouth and drains an area of 2.19 square miles (5.7 km^{2}).

== Hydrology ==
At its mouth, the peak annual discharge of Sutton Creek has a 10 percent chance of reaching 1,570 cubic feet per second (44 m^{3}/s). It has a 2 percent chance of reaching 3,610 cubic feet per second (102 m^{3}/s) and a 1 percent chance of reaching 4,130 cubic feet per second (117 m^{3}/s). The peak annual discharge has a 0.2 percent chance of reaching 8,430 cubic feet per second (239 m^{3}/s).

At the border between Franklin Township and Exeter Township, the peak annual discharge of Sutton Creek has a 10 percent chance of reaching 1,194 cubic feet per second (33.8 m^{3}/s). It has a 2 percent chance of reaching 2,104 cubic feet per second (59.6 m^{3}/s) and a 1 percent chance of reaching 2,595 cubic feet per second (73.5 m^{3}/s). The peak annual discharge has a 0.2 percent chance of reaching 4,035 cubic feet per second (114.3 m^{3}/s).

Upstream of the confluence of Cider Run, the peak annual discharge of Sutton Creek has a 10 percent chance of reaching 905 cubic feet per second (25.6 m^{3}/s). It has a 2 percent chance of reaching 1,611 cubic feet per second (45.6 m^{3}/s) and a 1 percent chance of reaching 1,994 cubic feet per second (56.5 m^{3}/s). The peak annual discharge has a 0.2 percent chance of reaching 3,121 cubic feet per second (88.4 m^{3}/s).

== Geography and geology ==
The elevation near the mouth of Sutton Creek is 545 feet (166 m) above sea level. The elevation of the creek's source is between 1,160 and 1,180 feet (350 and 360 m) above sea level.

Sutton Creek runs in a generally easterly direction. As of 2012, there are 2.1 miles (3.4 km) of pipelines in the watershed. However, another 3.0 miles (4.8 km) of natural gas pipeline were proposed. The creek flows from a notch in a mountain.

Sutton Creek and its tributaries have narrow 100-year floodplains. Most of the floodplains in Franklin Township are on the creek and its tributaries. The creek is located roughly 5 miles (8.0 km) upriver of the Wyoming Valley.

All of the bedrock in the watershed of Sutton Creek is made of sandstone. The surficial geology along the floor of the valley of Sutton Creek in its lower reaches mainly consists of alluvium. However, Wisconsinan Ice-Contact Stratified Drift occurs near the creek's mouth and some patches of a till known as Wisconsinan Till occur further upstream. Additionally, many areas have surficial geology featuring bedrock made of coal, conglomeratic sandstone, sandstone, and shale. The surficial geology alongside the creek continues to feature alluvium as far upstream as Lake Louise. However, in the watershed's upper reaches, Wisconsinan Till and bedrock consisting of sandstone and shale are more common. There is also a patch of Wisconsinan Ice-Contact Stratified Drift near the creek's headwaters.

== Watershed ==
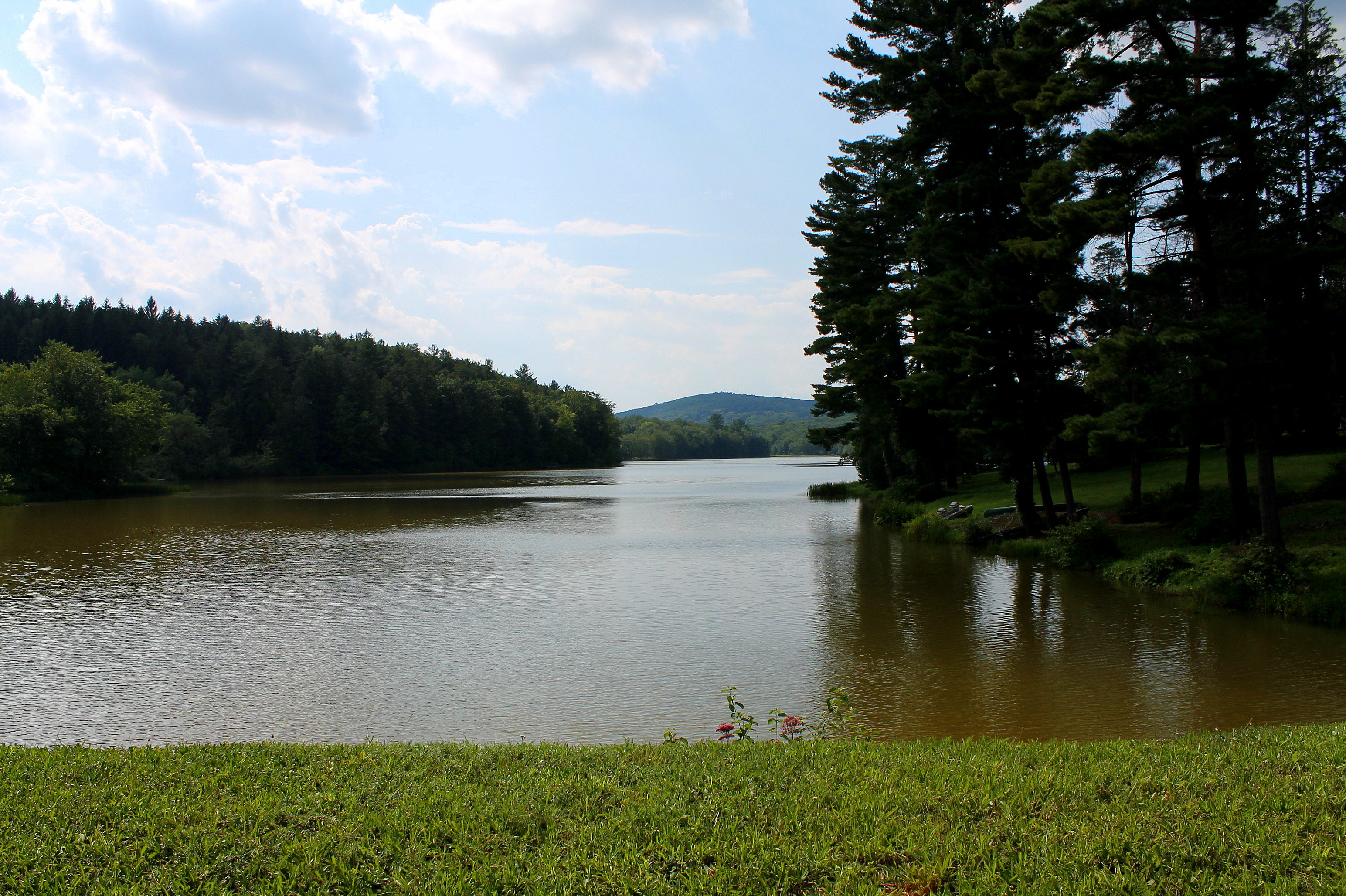
Lake Louise, a lake in the watershed of Sutton Creek

The watershed of Sutton Creek has an area of 11.5 square miles (30 km^{2}). The portion of the watershed that is upstream of the tributary Cider Run has an area of 5.46 square miles (14.1 km^{2}). The mouth of the creek is in the United States Geological Survey quadrangle of Ransom. However, its source is in the quadrangle of Center Moreland. There are a total of 16.0 miles (25.7 km) of streams in the watershed of the creek. Since the Chesapeake Bay is the ria of the Susquehanna River, the watershed of Sutton Creek is part of the basin of the Chesapeake Bay.

The main land use in the watershed of Sutton Creek is forested land. However, a significant fraction of the watershed is devoted to agricultural land. Lakes in the creek's watershed include Cummings Pond and Lake Louise, as well as a number of smaller lakes.

Sutton Creek occasionally experiences flooding. However, this flooding rarely causes significant damage since the creek's floodplain is relatively undeveloped.

== History ==
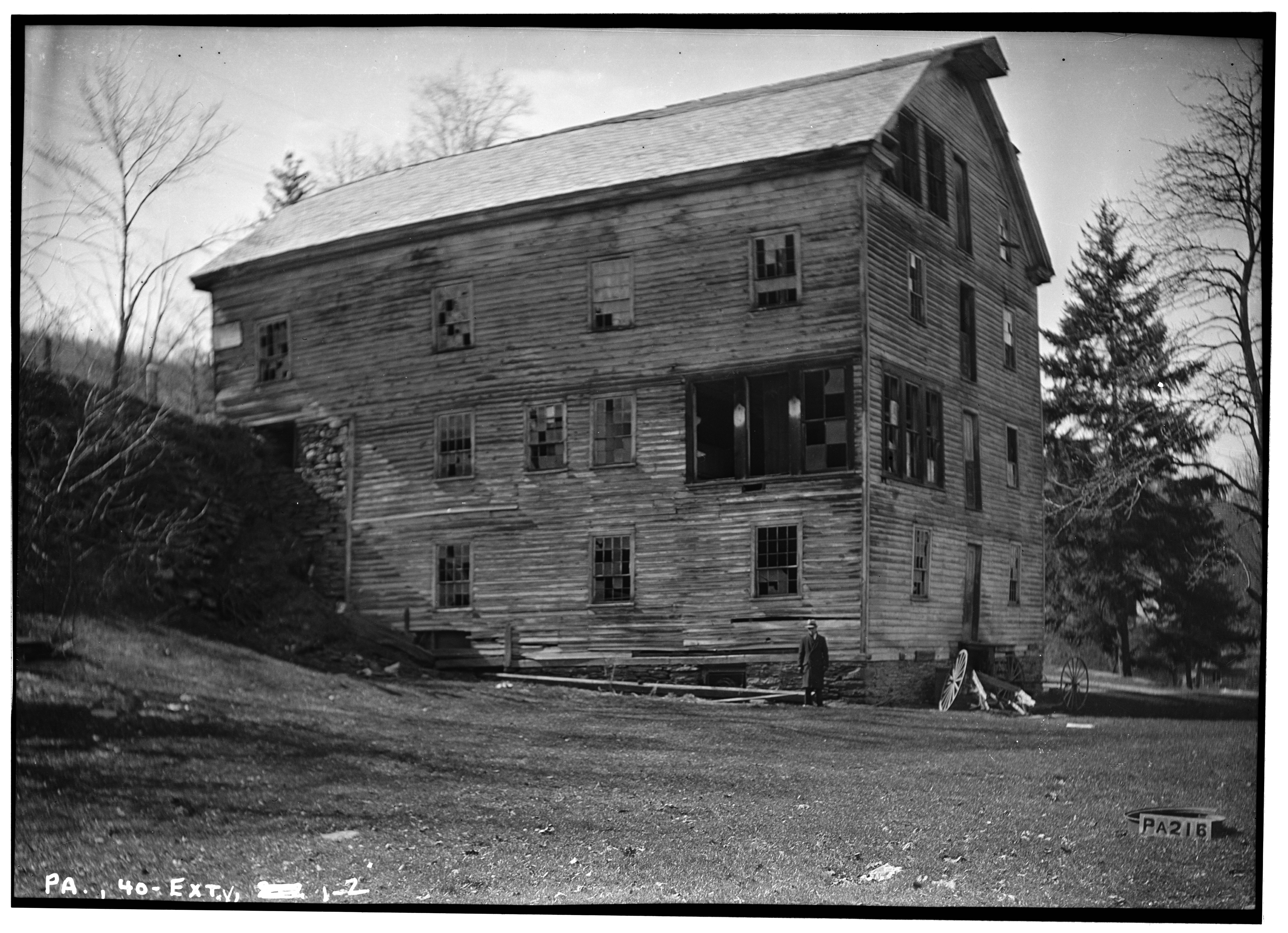
Elisha Atherton Coray Mill on Sutton Creek

Sutton Creek was entered into the Geographic Names Information System on August 2, 1979. Its identifier in the Geographic Names Information System is 1199653. The creek is also known as Sutton's Creek and Coray Creek.

James Sutton and James Hadsall constructed the first gristmill and the first sawmill in Exeter Township on Sutton Creek in 1776. However, the mills were destroyed in a military invasion in 1778. Samuel Sutton, the son of James Sutton, constructed a second mill there a few years later. In 1864, E. A. Coray, who owned the site at that time, constructed a third mill on the creek. The first sawmill in Franklin Township was also built on the creek in 1808 by a Mr. Munson. In the same year, Elijah Brace constructed the first gristmill in the township on the creek.

Two concrete tee beam bridges carrying Sutton Creek Road were built over Sutton Creek in 1925. Their lengths are 40.0 and 49.9 feet (12.2 and 15.2 m). A two-span bridge carrying State Route 1037 was built over the creek in Franklin Township at Lake Louise in 1940. It is 36.1 feet (11.0 m) long. A concrete culvert bridge carrying State Route 1033/Bodle Road was constructed over the creek in Exeter Township in 1962. This bridge is 21.0 feet (6.4 m) long. In 1999, a prestressed box beam or girders bridge with a length of 32.2 feet (9.8 m) was built and carries Pennsylvania Route 92 over the creek in Exeter Township. A concrete culvert bridge was built over the creek in Franklin Township in 2007. This bridge is 27.9 feet (8.5 m) long and carries State Route 1021.

The Elisha Atherton Coray Mill was located on Sutton Creek. It has been documented by the Historic American Buildings Survey.

== Biology ==
The drainage basin of Sutton Creek is designated as a Coldwater Fishery and a Migratory Fishery. A reach of 3.8 miles (6.1 km) of the creek was also historically stocked with trout by the Pennsylvania Fish and Boat Commission. However, in 1999, the reach of the creek was removed from the stocking program due to a rise in the frequency of landowner posting.

A total of 208 individual macroinvertebrates were observed in Sutton Creek at site Sutn05 in August 2012. These included two beetle genera, the caddisfly genus Macrostemum, the crayfish genus Orconectes, the dragonfly genus Boyeria, and the leech genus Macrobdella. Other taxa included three midge genera, a mayfly family, two scud genera, and the snail genus Physidae. A total of 13 taxa were observed at the site and the EPT taxa richness was 3. The Becks Index value was 1, the Hilsenhoff Biotic Index value was 5.077, and the Shannon Diversity Index value was 1.676.

At site Sutn04 166 individual macroinvertebrates were observed in Sutton Creek in August 2012. These included the beetle genus Dubiraphia, two caddisfly genera, the dancefly genus Chelifera, and the dragonfly genus Boyeria. Other macroinvertebrates included five mayfly genera, the midge family Chironomidae, and the scud genus Crangonyx. A total of 14 taxa were observed at this site and the EPT taxa richness was 7. The Backs Index value was also 7, the Hilsenhoff Biotic Index value was 3.976, and the Shannon Diversity Index value was 1.933.

== See also ==
- Lewis Creek (Susquehanna River), next tributary of the Susquehanna River going downriver
- Dymond Creek, next tributary of the Susquehanna River going upriver`
- List of rivers of Pennsylvania
