= Lake Louise (Pennsylvania) =

Lake in Luzerne County, Pennsylvania, United States

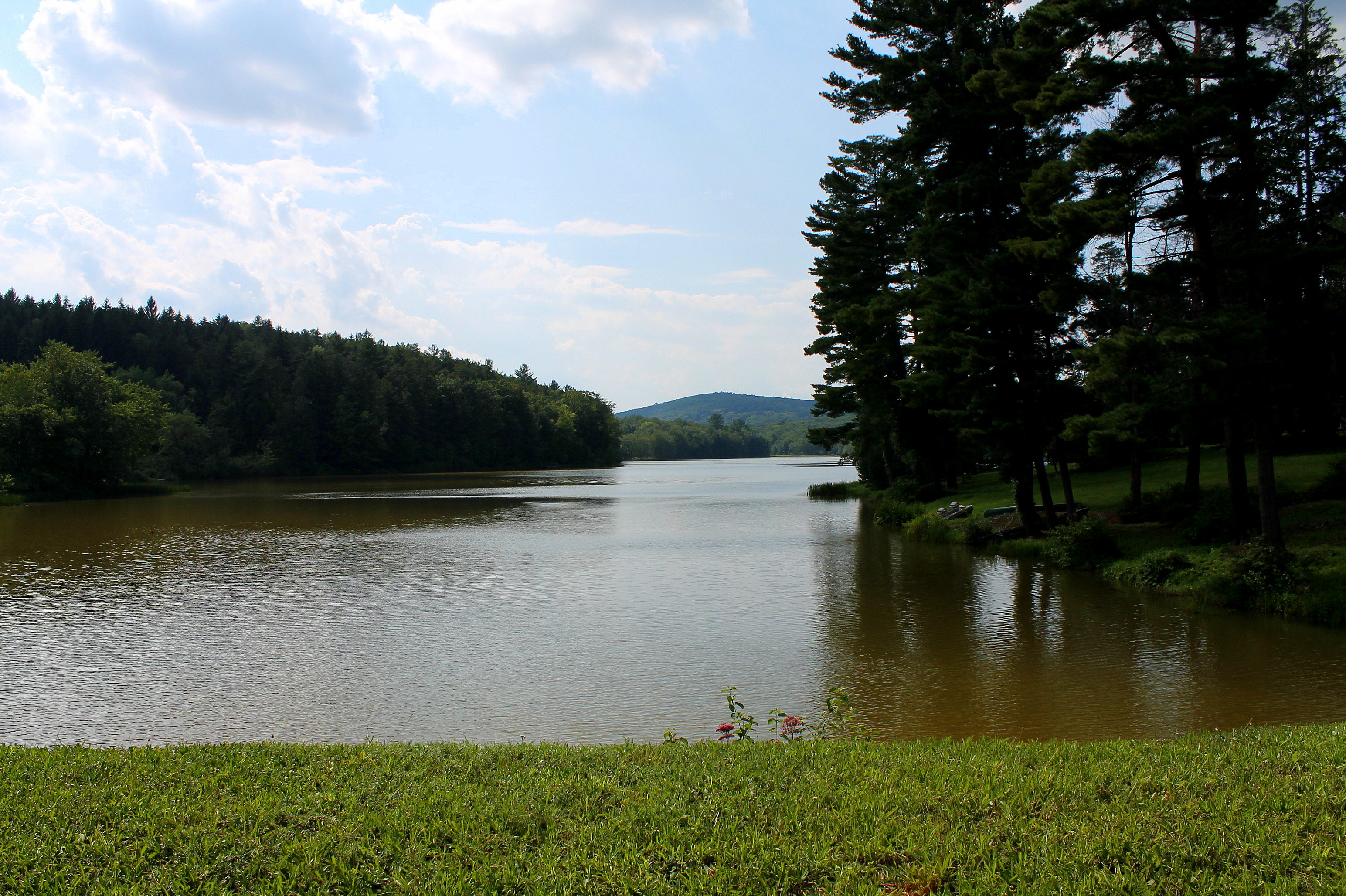
- Lake Louise in August 2016

- Location within Pennsylvania Location within the United States
- Location: Franklin Township, Luzerne County, Pennsylvania
- Coordinates: 41°22′57″N 75°54′49″W
- Primary inflows: Sutton Creek; two unnamed streams
- Primary outflows: Sutton Creek
- Catchment area: 2.69 sq mi (7.0 km^{2})
- Max. length: 4,000 ft (1,200 m)
- Surface area: 56 or 67 acres (23 or 27 ha)
- Water volume: 193 acre⋅ft (238,000 m^{3})
- Surface elevation: 1,083 ft (330 m)

Lake Louise is a lake in Luzerne County, Pennsylvania, in the United States. It has a surface area of approximately 67 acres (27 ha) on The National Map and is located entirely in Franklin Township. The lake is dammed by the Lake Louise Dam, which is in poor condition, as of 1980. Lake Louise is situated on Sutton Creek and drains an area of 2.69 square miles (7.0 km^{2}). As of 1980, its watershed is mostly forested. The Lake Louise Lake Association was given a Growing Greener mini-grant in 2012.

== Geography, geology, and watershed ==
The main inflows to Lake Louise are Sutton Creek and two unnamed streams. The main outflow is Sutton Creek. The lake has an elevation of 1,083 feet (330 m) above sea level. Under normal conditions, the lake has an area of 56 acres (23 ha), a volume of 193 acre-feet (238,000 m^{3}), and a length of 4,000 feet (1,200 m). However, the maximum storage capacity is 705 acre-feet (870,000 m^{3}). The lake is 4 miles (6.4 km) upstream of the Susquehanna River.

Lake Louise is dammed by the Lake Louise Dam. As of 1980, this dam is in poor condition, with a spillway capable of handling 45 percent of a probably maximum flood. It was classified as an "unsafe non-emergency dam". The dam is an earthfill dam with a height of 16 feet (4.9 m), a length of 210 feet (64 m), and a width of 26 feet (7.9 m) at the top.

Lake Louise is in the Glaciated Low Plateaus section of the Appalachian Plateaus physiographic province. The main rock formation underlying the lake is the Devonian-age Susquehanna Group, which consists of conglomerate, siltstone, sandstone, and shale.

The watershed of Lake Louise has an area of 2.69 square miles (7.0 km^{2}). As of 1980, the watershed of Lake Louise is mostly forested. Most slopes in the watershed are gentle or moderate.

Lake Louise is entirely within the United States Geological Survey quadrangle of Center Moreland.

== Hydrology ==
In October 2007, the concentration of nitrate/nitrogen at the inlets to Lake Louise ranged from 0.19 to 0.33 milligrams per liter (1.2×10^{−5} to 2.1×10^{−5} lb/cu ft). In November 2009, the concentration ranged from 0.10 to 0.46 milligrams per liter (6.2×10^{−6} to 2.87×10^{−5} lb/cu ft) and in May 2011, the concentration ranged from 0.09 to 0.33 milligrams per liter (5.6×10^{−6} to 2.06×10^{−5} lb/cu ft). At the outlet of Lake Louise, the concentrations on those three dates were 0.19 milligrams per liter (1.2×10^{−5} lb/cu ft), 0.12 milligrams per liter (7.5×10^{−6} lb/cu ft), and 0.24 milligrams per liter (1.5×10^{−5} lb/cu ft), respectively. For comparison, healthy lakes generally have concentrations of less than 0.05 milligrams per liter (3.1×10^{−6} lb/cu ft) in the summertime.

In October 2007, the concentration of phosphorus at the inlets to Lake Louise ranged from 0.61 to 1.62 milligrams per liter (3.8×10^{−5} to 0.000101 lb/cu ft). In November 2009, the concentration ranged from 0.04 to 0.99 milligrams per liter (2.5×10^{−6} to 6.18×10^{−5} lb/cu ft) and in May 2011, the concentration ranged from 0.04 to 0.53 milligrams per liter (2.5×10^{−6} to 3.31×10^{−5} lb/cu ft). At the outlet of Lake Louise, the concentrations on those three dates were 0.00 milligrams per liter (0 lb/cu ft), 0.29 milligrams per liter (1.8×10^{−5} lb/cu ft), and 0.59 milligrams per liter (3.7×10^{−5} lb/cu ft), respectively. For comparison, a phosphorus concentration of more than 0.03 milligrams per liter (1.9×10^{−6} lb/cu ft) indicates a eutrophic lake.

== History ==
Lake Louise was entered into the Geographic Names Information System on August 2, 1979. Its identifier in the Geographic Names Information System is 1199089.

In 2012, the Lake Louise Lake Association was awarded a Growing Greener mini-grant for sediment removal, shoreline stabilization, riparian buffer establishment, and invasive species control on Lake Louise.

== See also ==
- List of lakes in Pennsylvania
- Cummings Pond, also in the Sutton Creek watershed
