= Lewis Creek (Susquehanna River tributary) =

Physical characteristics
- Source
  - location: hill in Exeter Township, Luzerne County, Pennsylvania
  - elevation: just under 1,160 feet (350 m)
- Mouth
  - location: Susquehanna River in Exeter Township, Luzerne County, Pennsylvania
  - coordinates: 41°23′17″N 75°49′23″W
  - elevation: 548 ft (167 m)
- Length: 1.8 mi (2.9 km)
- Basin size: 1.64 sq mi (4.2 km^{2})

Basin features
- Progression: Susquehanna River → Chesapeake Bay

Lewis Creek is a tributary of the Susquehanna River in Luzerne County, Pennsylvania, in the United States. It is approximately 1.8 miles (2.9 km) long and flows through Exeter Township. The watershed of the creek has an area of 1.64 square miles (4.2 km^{2}). The creek is not designated as impaired and has typical water chemistry for a stream of its geology and land use. Rock formations in its watershed include the Catskill Formation.

Most of the watershed of Lewis Creek is on forested land. However, agricultural and residential land are also present in some areas. A plaster and clover mill historically operated on the creek. A stream inventory was carried out on Lewis Creek in August 2005. It is designated as a Coldwater Fishery and a Migratory Fishery, as well as Class A Wild Trout Waters. A total of 13 species, including brook trout and brown trout, inhabit the creek.

== Course ==
Lewis Creek begins on a hill in Exeter Township. It flows east-northeast for several tenths of a mile, entering a valley. The creek then turns northeast for several tenths of a mile. Its valley becomes narrower and shallower for a short distance before the creek leaves the valley, crosses Pennsylvania Route 92, and reaches its confluence with the Susquehanna River.

Lewis Creek joins the Susquehanna River 202.94 miles (326.60 km) upriver of its mouth.

== Hydrology and climate ==
Lewis Creek is not designated as an impaired waterbody. The creek's water chemistry is typical for streams of its geology and land use. It is fertile enough to avoid experiencing acid flushes.

The concentration of alkalinity in Lewis Creek is 42 milligrams per liter. The concentration of water hardness is 57 milligrams per liter. The creek is slightly alkaline, with a pH of 7.2. It has a high specific conductance of 216 micromhos.

The water temperature of Lewis Creek was measured to be 18.6 °C (65.5 °F) at 10:15 A.M. on August 8, 2005. The air temperature near the creek at this time was 22.0 °C (71.6 °F).

== Geography and geology ==
The elevation near the mouth of Lewis Creek is 548 feet (167 m) above sea level. The elevation of the creek's source is just under 1,160 feet (350 m) above sea level.

Lewis Creek is a small coldwater stream. The headwaters of the creek are on Mount Zion. In its lower 984 feet (300 m), it has an average width of 1.4 metres (4.6 ft). The gradient of the creek is 77 metres (253 ft) per 1 kilometre (0.62 mi).

The rocks in the watershed of Lewis Creek mainly consist of Devonian sandstones, shales, and siltstones of the Catskill Formation.

== Watershed ==
The watershed of Lewis Creek has an area of 1.64 square miles (4.2 km^{2}). The mouth of the creek is in the United States Geological Survey quadrangle of Ransom. However, its source is in the quadrangle of Pittston.

The main land use in the watershed of Lewis Creek is forested land. However, rural residential areas and a small amount of agricultural land occurs along the creek's corridor. Additionally, there are some manmade ponds in the watershed. Major roads in the watershed include Pennsylvania Route 92. A bridge carrying that route crosses Lewis Creek in Exeter Township. However, it is listed as a structurally deficient bridge by the Pennsylvania Department of Transportation. Another bridge carries Appletree Road over the creek near its mouth via a culvert. Deficiencies in the culvert have been known to cause flooding.

As of 2005, the population density of the watershed of Lewis Creek is 77 people per square kilometer. The entire length of the creek is on private property that is closed to access. However, 90 percent of the creek's length is within 328 feet (100 m) of a road and all of its length is within 984 feet (300 m) of one.

== History and recreation ==
Lewis Creek was entered into the Geographic Names Information System on August 2, 1979. Its identifier in the Geographic Names Information System is 1199033.

In 1845, a plaster and clover mill was being operated on Lewis Creek by Lloyd Jones. However, the mill was rendered obsolete by the introduction of horse-powered threshers.

A stream inventory was carried out on Lewis Creek in August 2005. The creek and several dozen other streams in Pennsylvania were evaluated for High-Quality Coldwater Fishery status in 2012.

The mouth of Lewis Creek is near the Apple Tree Access Ramp of the Pennsylvania Fish and Boat Commission. No part of the creek is open to public fishing. However, a few landowners along the creek do utilize it for this purpose.

== Biology ==
The drainage basin of Lewis Creek is designated as a Coldwater Fishery and a Migratory Fishery. Wild trout naturally reproduce in the creek from its headwaters downstream to its mouth. The entire length of the creek is considered by the Pennsylvania Fish and Boat Commission to be Class A Wild Trout Waters for brook trout.

In 2005, 13 species of fish were observed in Lewis Creek. This is very high for a stream of its size. There were 34 brook trout and three brown trout of legal size per 0.6 miles (0.97 km) in the creek. This equates to 115 brook trout and 10 brown trout, with lengths of 7 to 8 inches (18 to 20 cm) in the creek. The biomass of wild brook trout was 37.39 kilograms per hectare.

In addition to brook trout and brown trout, large populations of young fallfish have been observed in Lewis Creek, even though the species has been declining in population in the area. The only game fish in the creek are brook trout and brown trout. Young-of-the-year were unusually rare in the creek in 2005. Other fish species inhabiting it include central stoneroller, spottail shiners, swallowtail shiners, bluntnose minnows, eastern blacknose dace, longnose dace, white suckers, tessellated darters, banded darters, and sculpins.

== See also ==
- Gardner Creek (Susquehanna River), next tributary of the Susquehanna River going downriver
- Sutton Creek (Susquehanna River), next tributary of the Susquehanna River going upriver
- List of rivers of Pennsylvania
