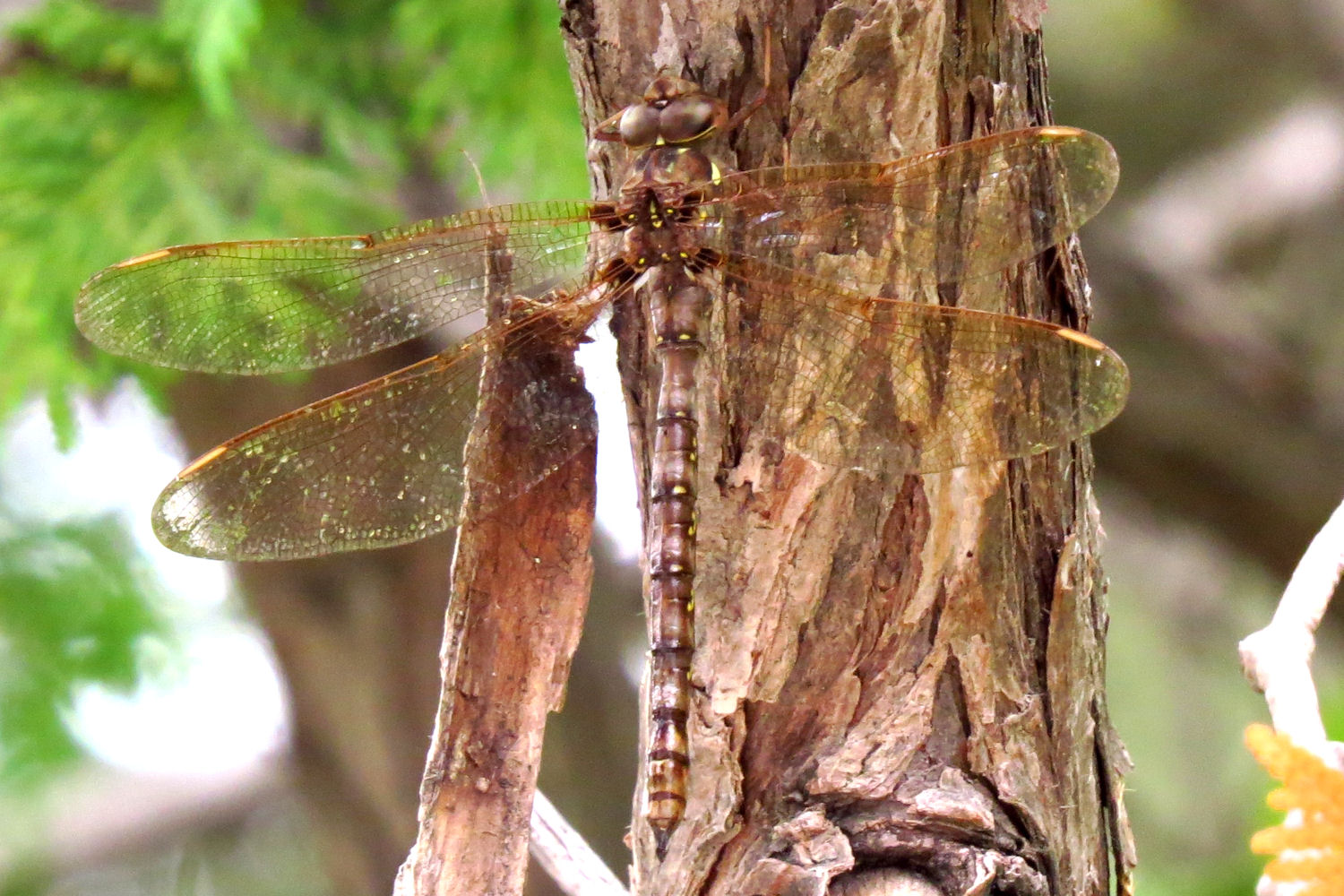
- Cantley, Quebec

Conservation status
- Least Concern (IUCN 3.1)

Scientific classification
- Kingdom: Animalia
- Phylum: Arthropoda
- Clade: Pancrustacea
- Class: Insecta
- Order: Odonata
- Infraorder: Anisoptera
- Family: Aeshnidae
- Genus: Boyeria
- Species: B. vinosa

Binomial name
- Boyeria vinosa Say, 1839

Synonyms
- Boyeria quadriguttata Burmeister, 1839

= Boyeria vinosa =

Species of dragonfly

Boyeria vinosa, the fawn darner, is a species of dragonfly in the family Aeshnidae. It is found in south-eastern Canada and eastern USA. Its natural habitat is rivers. They are most active at dusk, and may be common but overlooked in an area due to only being active in low light conditions.

== Description ==
Fawn darner adults are brown and rather featureless except for two bold yellow/white spots on each side of the thorax. The abdomen is brown with faint yellow markings. The wings have small brown patches at their bases and become tinted brown with age. Sexes may be distinguished by eye color (some blue/green in males, all-brown in females), abdomen thickness, and cerci length.

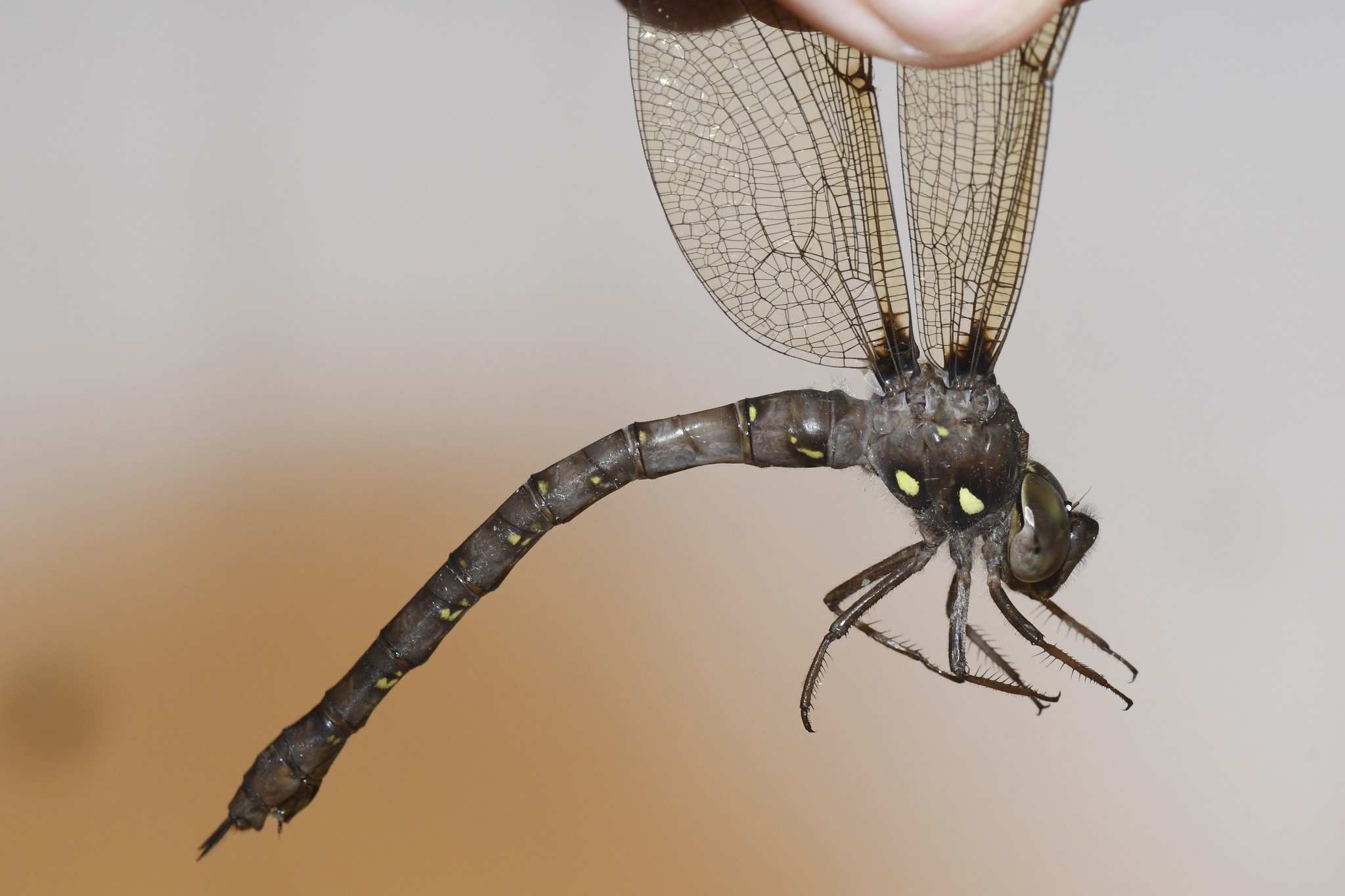
Female adult

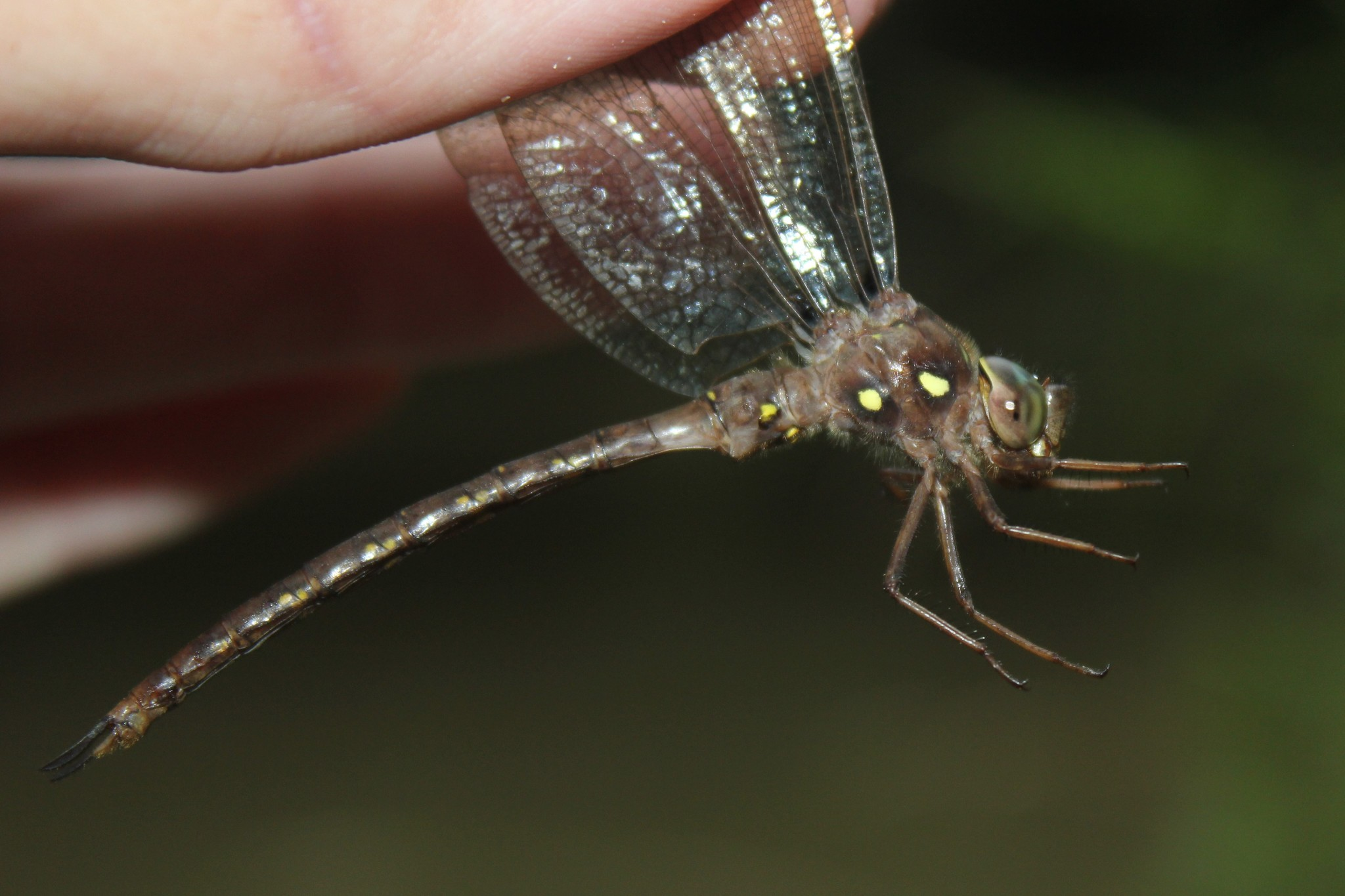
Male adult

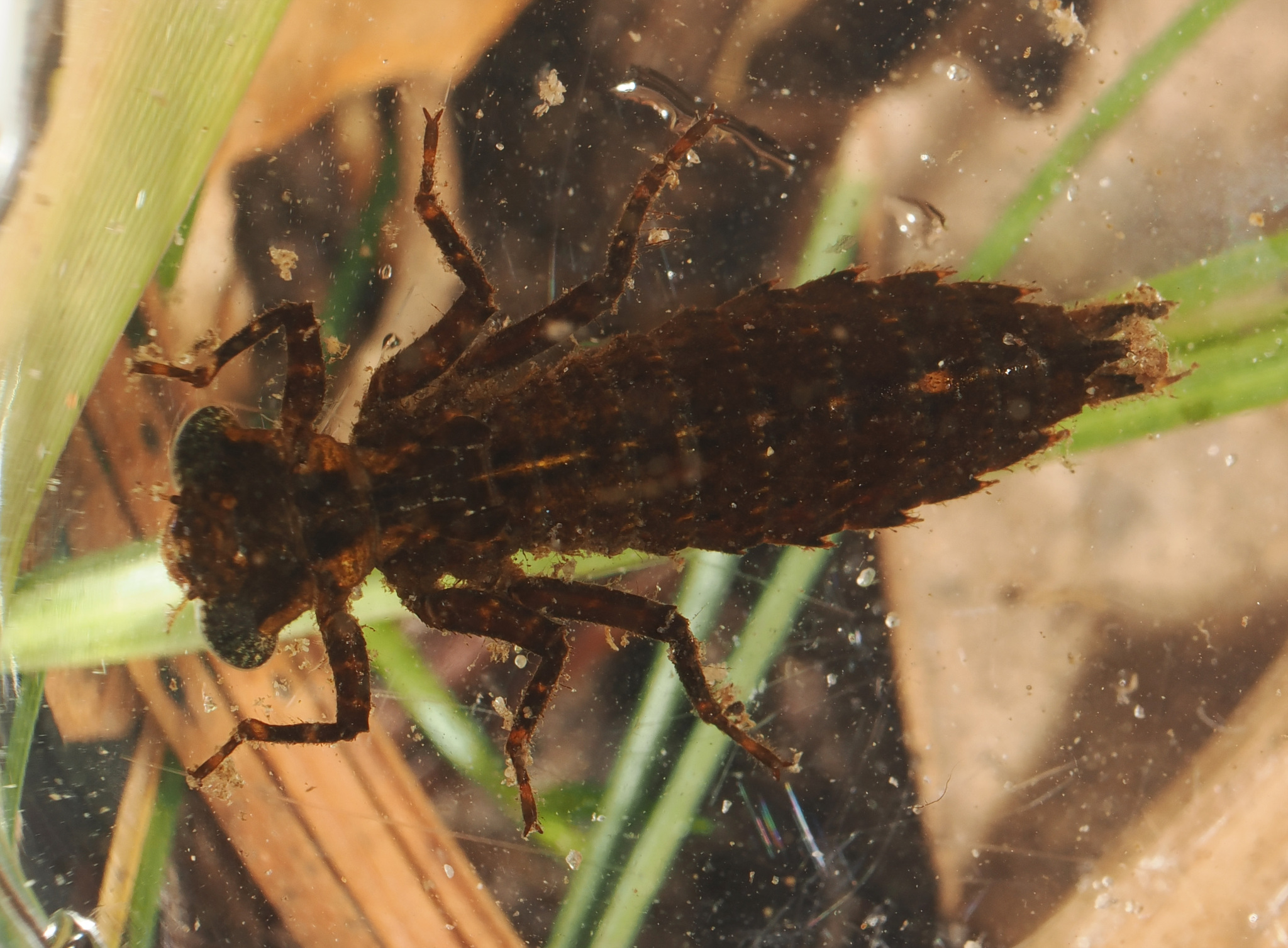
Nymph

== Etymology ==
The genus name Boyeria refers to the French entomologist E. L. J. H. Boyer de Fonscolombe. The specific epithet vinosa means "full of wine", which may refer to either the coloration or its sometime irregular flight.

The common name "fawn darner" refers to the adult being brown with pale spots like a deer fawn, and being a member of the darner family Aeshnidae.

== Behavior ==
Fawn darners cruise or patrol clearings or over water to forage and look for mates, often in late afternoon or early morning. They fly low, typically following edges and exploring nooks and crannies. When not patrolling a beat, they rest by hanging from tree twigs.

Females oviposit in wet wood at or below the water level. This species has been documented to complete one generation every two years.

== Distribution ==
The farn darner is found throughout the eastern United States and southeastern Canada.

== Habitat ==
Fawn darners inhabit streams with low to moderate flow, both in dense woodland and more open country. They may also be found along lake shores.

Larvae are generalists and may be found in all sediment types, but prefer streambeds of 0.5–10-centimetre (0.20–3.94 in) gravel and debris dams.
