= Cider Run =

Cider Run may refer to:

- Cider Run (Bowman Creek), Wyoming County, Pennsylvania
- Cider Run (Sutton Creek), Luzerne County, Pennsylvania
