= Crangonyx floridanus =

Scientific classification
- Domain: Eukaryota
- Kingdom: Animalia
- Phylum: Arthropoda
- Class: Malacostraca
- Order: Amphipoda
- Family: Crangonyctidae
- Genus: Crangonyx
- Species: C. floridanus

Binomial name
- Crangonyx floridanus Bousfield, 1963

Species of crustacean

Crangonyx floridanus is a species of amphipod. Also known as the Florida crangonyx, Crangonyx floridanus is a small omnivorous, freshwater amphipod. These freshwater amphipods originated from North America. They have a high invasion potential due to their high growth rate and wide ecological amplitude. Their growth rates have a substantial effect on local populations of the natural communities. Native populations may be reduced or eliminated by this invading species.

== Description ==
Crangonyx floridanus has a small head containing an anterior lobe, and medium-sized eyes. C. floridanus also contains two distinctive antennas, arranged in no particular order. One antenna is typically twice the size of the other, and contains an adornment flagellum. Its body is composed of a tightly packed interior and a smooth exterior, lined by coxal plates. Plates 1–4 are found rooted and lined with small hair-like bristles. These range in order from small or large.

== Life history ==
Crangonyx floridanus displays two sexes, male and female, and the young are hatched into a brood pouch before they are released into the water. In Japan, it was found that females are present year-round. Females can carry eggs at approximately 4.5 mm in length. There is a direct correlation between the size of the female and the number of eggs it can bear. For example, if a female's body size is 7 mm in length, their mean egg number is 35.5.

Egg development time also corresponds to increasing temperature. As the temperatures rise, the egg maturation rate correspondingly increases as well. These warm temperatures correlate with their habitats. Their native region is the Southeastern region of the U.S. (Florida–Louisiana), and the introduced regions of Sacramento-San Joaquin Delta, United Kingdom, and Japan. Generally, Crangonyx floridanus can be found in inland lakes and rivers, but has now spread its distribution to the mouth of rivers.

== Environmental characteristics ==
Crangonyx floridanus is an omnivorous freshwater amphipod with a high rate of adaptability. They are able to reside within temperatures ranging from 4–20 °C, though some may survive in temperatures as high as 30 °C. Altogether, this species seeks to reside within cool and high quality waters. Some precise sites where C. floridanus can be found are at headstreams, spring-fed rivers or lakes, and areas with a high quantity of submerged vegetation. Their primary food sources are algae, aquatic plants and invertebrates, depending on their availability. However, this invasive species has also been noted to reside within soft bottom habitats. Its varying characteristics and high vicinity of adaptability make C. floridanus an exceptional invasive species in various ecosystems.

== Distribution ==
Crangonyx floridanus originates from the Southeastern states of the U.S., with its main concentrations in the Florida peninsula, South Carolina and Louisiana (Bousfield, 1958; Holsinger, 1972; U.S. National Museum of Natural History, 2015). By 1989, Crangonyx floridanus had colonized the main island of Japan. Since 1989, C. floridanus have had rapid growing and dispersal rates, it has become alarming rate for the native species of the areas. In September 2017 and later in 2018, it was also identified in the largest natural lake in England, Lake Windermere. Further investigation has taken place since to confirm its identity, as it has previously been confused with other species (Crangonyx pseudogracilis) as they have vast similarities.
