= Franklin Township, Luzerne County, Pennsylvania =

Township in Pennsylvania, US

Coordinates: 41°23′00″N 75°52′59″W

- Township
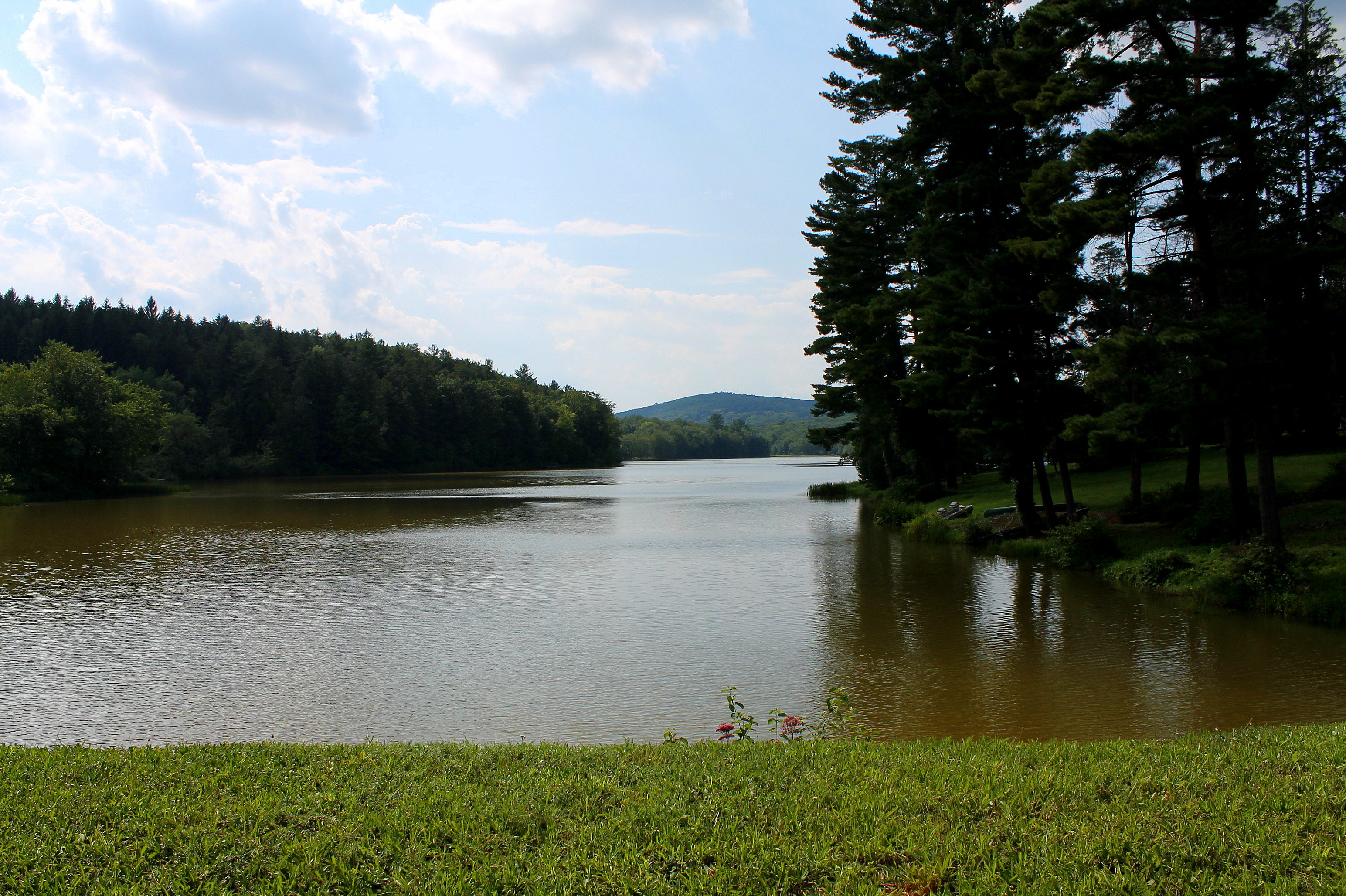
- Lake Louise in Franklin Township

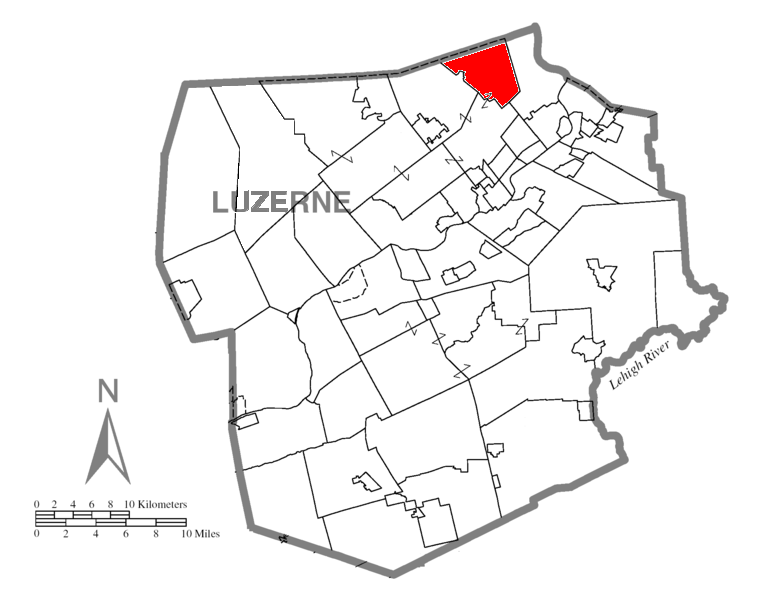
- Map of Luzerne County highlighting Franklin Township

- Map of Pennsylvania highlighting Luzerne County
- Country: United States
- State: Pennsylvania
- County: Luzerne

Area
  - Total: 13.05 sq mi (33.80 km^{2})
  - Land: 12.70 sq mi (32.89 km^{2})
  - Water: 0.35 sq mi (0.91 km^{2})

Population (2020)
  - Total: 1,712 ▼
  - Estimate (2021): 1,718
  - Density: 137.4/sq mi (53.06/km^{2})
- Time zone: UTC-5 (Eastern (EST))
  - Summer (DST): UTC-4 (EDT)
- FIPS code: 42-079-27424
- Website: www.ftwp.com

Franklin Township is a township in Luzerne County, Pennsylvania, United States. It is part of the Back Mountain, a 118 square mile region in northern Luzerne County. The population was 1,712 at the 2020 census.

== History ==
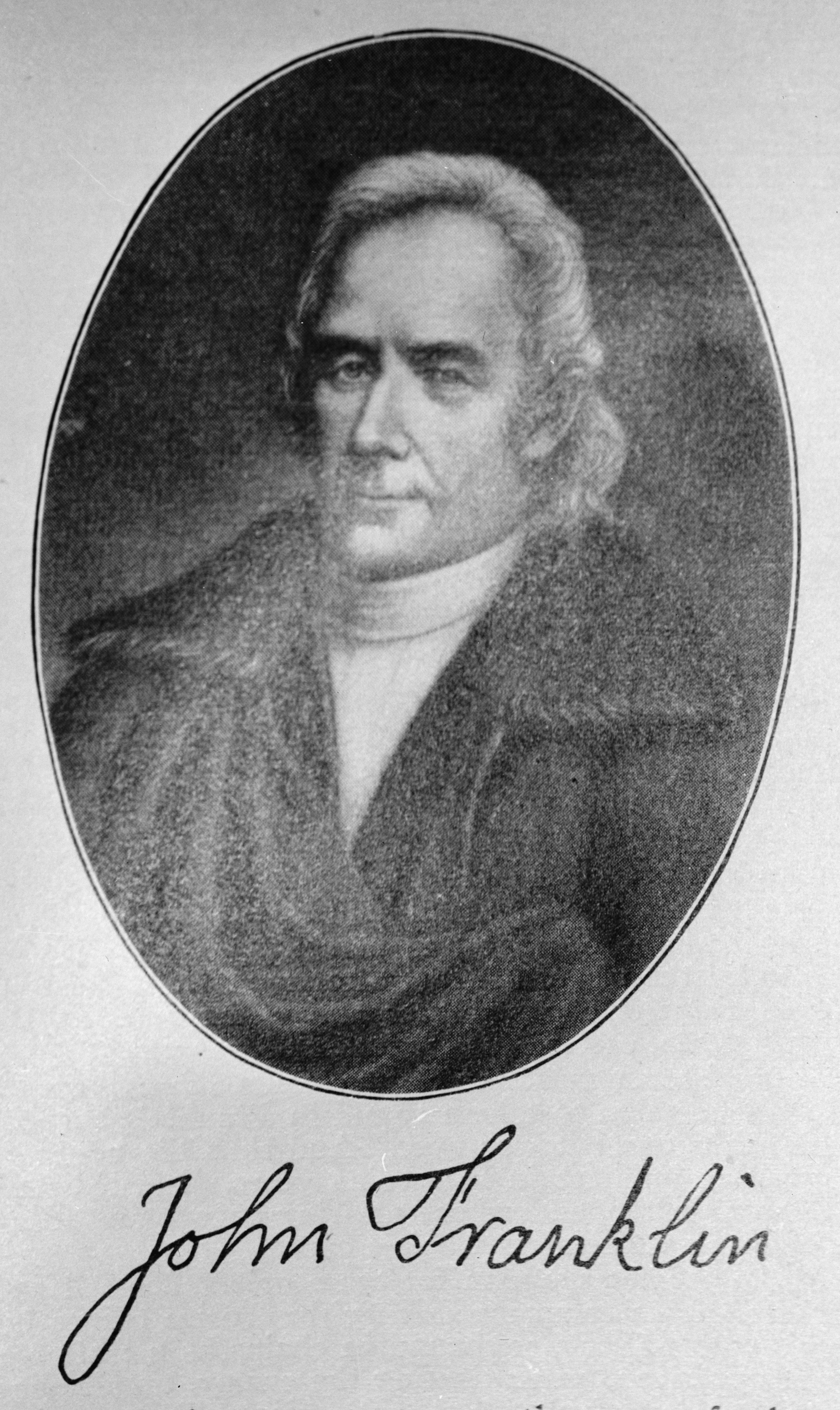
Colonel John Franklin

=== Establishment ===
Gideon Bebee is believed to be one of the earliest settlers in modern-day Franklin Township; he came to the area in the 18th century. The Pease family, Ezra Olds, and Michael Munson followed in Bebee's footsteps. Other earlier settlers included Elisha Brace, William Brace, Benjamin Chandler, and Joseph Cone.

Franklin Township was formed from parts of Kingston, Dallas, Northmoreland, and Exeter Townships when a Luzerne County Court authorized its organization in the early 1840s. It's presumed the new township was named in honor of Colonel John Franklin, a leader and hero of the Pennamite-Yankee Wars and the Revolutionary War.

On August 11, 1848, the township's borders were enlarged at the further expense of Kingston and Exeter Townships. By 1850, the population of Franklin Township grew to 833 residents.

== Geography ==
According to the United States Census Bureau, the township has a total area of 13.1 square miles (33.8 km^{2}), of which 12.7 square miles (32.9 km^{2}) is land and 0.35 square miles (0.9 km^{2}), or 2.69%, is water. Most of the township is made up of hilly farmland and forests. Homes are scattered throughout the municipality. Lake Louise, Cummings Pond, Perrins Marsh, and Lake Catalpa are located in the western portion of Franklin Township. Other smaller lakes and streams (e.g., Sutton Creek and Cider Run) are scattered throughout the community.

== Demographics ==
Historical population
Census	Pop.	Note	%±
2000	1,601		—
2010	1,757		9.7%
2020	1,712		−2.6%
2021 (est.)	1,718		0.4%

At the 2000 census there were 1,601 people, 629 households, and 481 families living in the township. The population density was 125.9 inhabitants per square mile (48.6/km^{2}). There were 679 housing units at an average density of 53.4 per square mile (20.6/km^{2}). The racial makeup of the township was 99.56% White, 0.06% African American, 0.06% from other races, and 0.31% from two or more races. Hispanic or Latino of any race were 0.87%.

There were 629 households, 31.5% had children under the age of 18 living with them, 65.3% were married couples living together, 7.3% had a female householder with no husband present, and 23.4% were non-families. 20.0% of households were made up of individuals, and 7.9% were one person aged 65 or older. The average household size was 2.55 and the average family size was 2.94.

The age distribution was 23.2% under the age of 18, 5.7% from 18 to 24, 30.0% from 25 to 44, 28.3% from 45 to 64, and 12.8% 65 or older. The median age was 41 years. For every 100 females, there were 102.4 males. For every 100 females age 18 and over, there were 97.3 males.

The median household income was $45,150 and the median family income was $51,310. Males had a median income of $36,563 versus $25,045 for females. The per capita income for the township was $21,014. About 5.6% of families and 7.1% of the population were below the poverty line, including 9.9% of those under age 18 and 7.8% of those age 65 or over.
