= Gardner Creek (Susquehanna River tributary) =

Gardner Creek Gardiners Creek, Gardners Creek

Physical characteristics
- Source
  - location: valley near Newton Ransom Boulevard in Newton Township, Lackawanna County, Pennsylvania
  - elevation: between 1,300 and 1,320 feet (400 and 400 m)
- Mouth
  - location: Susquehanna River in Ransom Township, Pennsylvania
  - coordinates: 41°23′18″N 75°49′07″W
  - elevation: 545 ft (166 m)
- Length: 9.1 mi (14.6 km)
- Basin size: 18.1 mi^{2} (47 km^{2})

Basin features
- Progression: Susquehanna River → Chesapeake Bay
- Tributaries
  - left: four unnamed tributaries
  - right: three unnamed tributaries

Gardner Creek (also known as Gardiners Creek or Gardners Creek) is a tributary of the Susquehanna River in Lackawanna County, Pennsylvania, in the United States. It is approximately 9.1 miles (14.6 km) long and flows through Newton Township and Ransom Township. The watershed of the creek has an area of 18.1 square miles (47 km^{2}). The creek is not designated as an impaired waterbody. The surficial geology in its vicinity mainly consists of alluvial terrace, alluvium, Wisconsinan Till, and bedrock. However, Wisconsinan Ice-Contact Stratified Drift, fill, alluvial fan, peat, and wetlands also occur. The creek is the main source of flooding in Ransom Township.

The area at the mouth of Gardner Creek was settled as early as 1769. A number of mills, including a sawmill and a gristmill, were constructed on the creek in the early 19th century. Numerous bridges were built over it in the 20th century. The creek experienced streambank erosion during Tropical Storm Agnes in 1972. It is designated as a Coldwater Fishery and a Migratory Fishery. Wild trout naturally reproduce within it.

== Course ==
Gardner Creek begins in a valley near Newton Ransom Boulevard in Newton Township. It flows southwest for a short distance and enters Corby Swamp. From the western end of the swamp, it flows west-southwest for a short distance before turning south and entering a much deeper valley. The creek then turns southwest for several tenths of a mile before receiving an unnamed tributary from the left. Its valley then becomes narrower and shallower as it turns south-southwest for a few miles, receiving one unnamed tributary from the left and another from the right. The creek turns south for more than a mile and its valley becomes broader and deeper again as it flows past the base of a mountain known as Pinnacle Rock. The creek receives another unnamed tributary from the left before turning west for several tenths of a mile, still flowing through a deep valley. It turns south-southwest for more than a mile and receives two more unnamed tributaries (one from the left and one from the right). It then abruptly turns west-northwest for several tenths of a mile before receiving an unnamed tributary from the right. It then turns south-southwest for more than a mile before leaving its valley and reaching its confluence with the Susquehanna River.

Gardner Creek joins the Susquehanna River 202.86 miles (326.47 km) upriver of its mouth.

== Hydrology ==
Gardner Creek is not designated as an impaired stream. Newton Township once requested a permit to discharge stormwater into the creek.

The peak annual discharge of Gardner Creek at its mouth has a 10 percent chance of reaching 2350 cubic feet per second. It has a 2 percent chance of reaching 4850 cubic feet per second and a 1 percent chance of reaching 6450 cubic feet per second. The peak annual discharge has a 0.2 percent chance of reaching 12,500 cubic feet per second.

== Geography and geology ==
The elevation near the mouth of Gardner Creek is 545 feet (166 m) above sea level. The elevation of the creek's source is between 1,300 and 1,320 feet (400 and 400 m) above sea level.

For most of the length of Gardner Creek, the surficial geology on the floor of its valley consists mainly of alluvium. However, alluvial terrace is present in the lower reaches. The valley walls and surrounding areas have surficial geology consisting of a glacial or resedimented till known as Wisconsinan Till and bedrock consisting of coal, conglomeratic sandstone, sandstone, and shale. Wisconsinan Ice-Contact Stratified Drift, fill, alluvial fan, peat, and wetlands also occur in the surficial geology in the vicinity of the creek.

== Watershed ==
The watershed of Gardner Creek has an area of 18.1 square miles (47 km^{2}). The creek's mouth is in the United States Geological Survey quadrangle of Ransom. However, its source is in the quadrangle of Scranton.

Gardner Creek is the main source of flooding in Ransom Township. The creek is typically "placid" but can be transformed into a "raging torrent" by flooding.

The watershed of Gardner Creek is one of three major watersheds in Lackawanna County that is in the Chesapeake Bay drainage basin. The others are the Lackawanna River and Tunkhannock Creek.

== History ==
Gardner Creek was entered into the Geographic Names Information System on August 2, 1979. Its identifier in the Geographic Names Information System is 1198784. The creek is also known as Gardiners Creek and Gardners Creek.

John and Richard Gardner settled at their father's farm at the mouth of Gardner Creek in 1769. The Gardner Ferry was established downstream of the mouth of the creek in 1795. It was renamed to the Ransom Ferry in 1923, but still existed in 1937. Elias Smith came from New Jersey and settled in an undeveloped part of Newton Township in 1816 and purchased a tract of 400 acres (160 ha) along Gardner Creek. Smith also built the first Newton Township's first sawmill on the creek in 1821. Additionally, the first gristmill in Ransom Township was built on the creek by Phineas Sherwood in 1825. Sherwood sold the mill to Absolom Young, who sold it to Jacob Dershimer. In 1844, Dershimer constructed a new mill on the site.

Historically, an aqueduct carried the Tunkhannock Line, a canal running from Wyalusing Creek to the Wyoming Division Canal, crossed over Gardner Creek. The aqueduct had one span and was 34 feet (10 m) long.

A concrete stringer/multi-beam or girder bridge carrying State Route 3005 was constructed over Gardner Creek in 1932. It is 45.9 feet (14.0 m) long and is in Ransom Township. A steel stringer/multi-beam or girder bridge carrying State Route 3006 was built over the creek in Newton Township in 1951. It is 32.2 feet (9.8 m) long. A prestressed box beam or girders bridge carrying the same road was built over the creek in 1958. This bridge is also in Newton Township and is 39.0 feet (11.9 m) long. A bridge of the same type, but carrying State Route 3002, was built across the creek in 1970. This bridge is 54.1 feet (16.5 m) long and is situated in Ransom Township. A concrete slab bridge with a length of 22.0 feet (6.7 m) long and carrying State Route 3009 was built over the creek in 1988 in Ransom Township. A prestressed box beam or girders bridge with a length of 88.9 feet (27.1 m) long and carrying State Route 3007/Evergreen Road was built across the creek in 1999 in Ransom Township.

Gardner Creek experienced significant flooding during Tropical Storm Agnes in 1972. The flood also caused streambank erosion and the inundation of basements and first floors of homes near the creek. Further rains and flash flooding in October 1976 caused more streambank erosion. For this reason, Ransom Township received $7000 in Federal Disaster Assistance Administration Funds to restore the creek's streambanks.

== Biology ==
The drainage basin of Gardner Creek is designated as a Coldwater Fishery and a Migratory Fishery. Wild trout naturally reproduce in the creek from its upper reaches downstream to its mouth. It is considered by the Pennsylvania Fish and Boat Commission to be approved trout waters. The creek has been stocked with brown trout and rainbow trout.

== See also ==
- Obendoffers Creek, next tributary of the Susquehanna River going downriver
- Lewis Creek (Susquehanna River), next tributary of the Susquehanna River going upriver
- List of rivers of Pennsylvania
