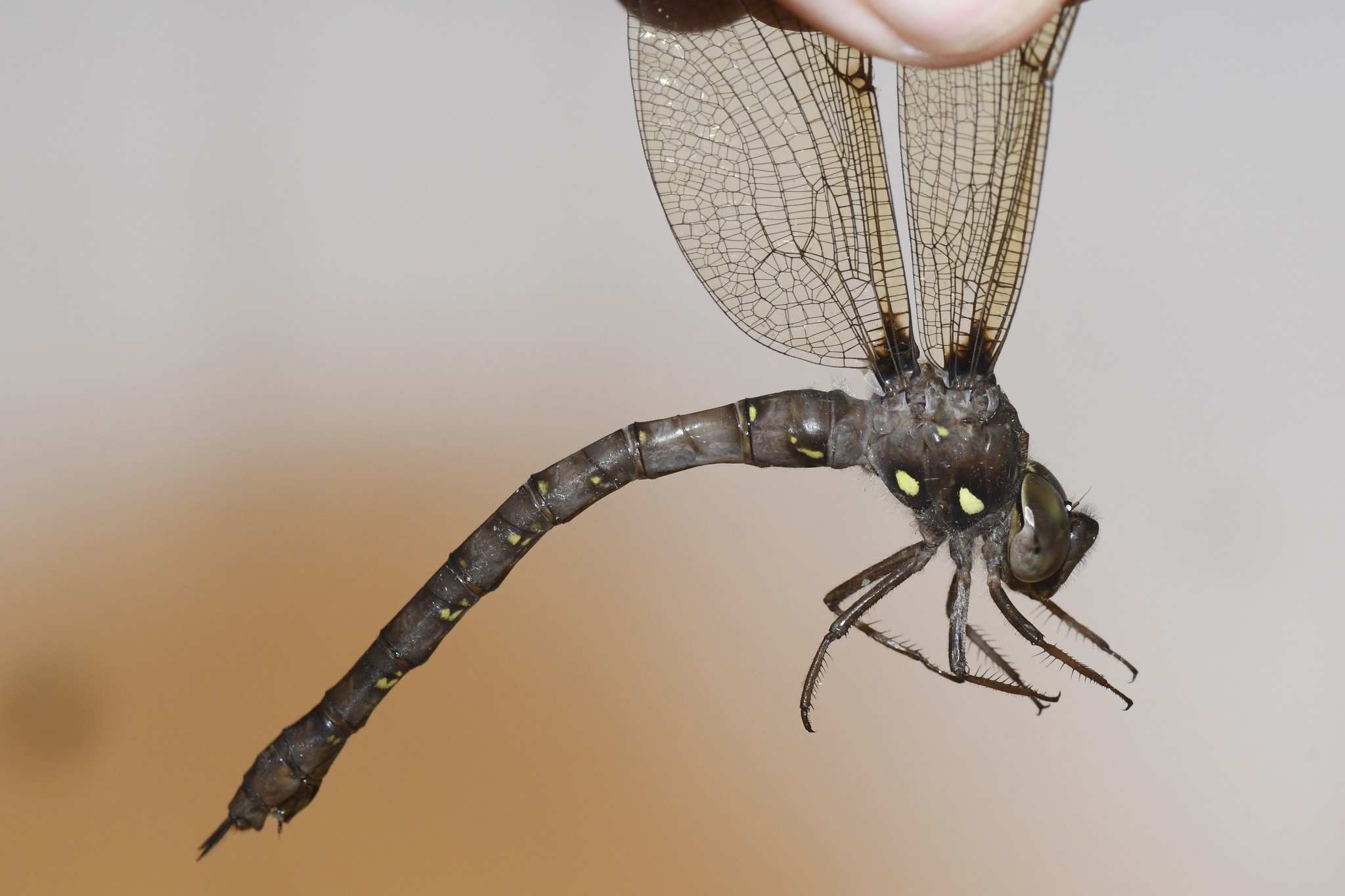
- Fawn darner (Boyeria vinosa) in Simcoe County, Ontario, Canada.

Scientific classification
- Kingdom: Animalia
- Phylum: Arthropoda
- Class: Insecta
- Order: Odonata
- Infraorder: Anisoptera
- Family: Aeshnidae
- Genus: Boyeria; McLachlan, 1896

= Boyeria =

Genus of dragonflies

Boyeria is a genus of dragonfly in the family Aeshnidae, commonly called spotted darners. They occur in temperate North America and Eurasia.

The name Boyeria commemorates the French entomologist Etienne Laurent Joseph Hippolyte Boyer de Fonscolombe

The genus contains the following seven described species:

- Boyeria cretensis Peters, 1991 – Cretan spectre
- Boyeria grafiana Williamson, 1907 – ocellated darner
- Boyeria irene (Fonscolombe, 1838) – western spectre
- Boyeria jamjari Jung, 2011
- Boyeria karubei Yokoi, 2002
- Boyeria maclachlani Selys, 1883
- Boyeria sinensis Asahina, 1978
- Boyeria vinosa (Say, 1840) – fawn darner
