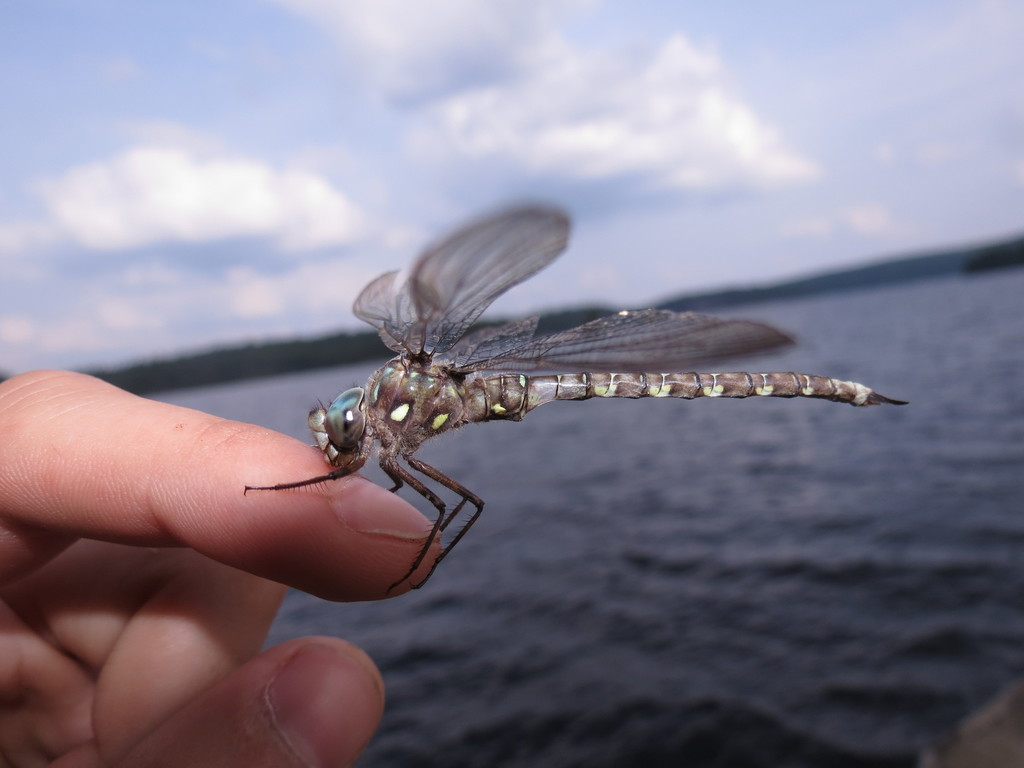

Conservation status
- Least Concern (IUCN 3.1)

Scientific classification
- Kingdom: Animalia
- Phylum: Arthropoda
- Class: Insecta
- Order: Odonata
- Infraorder: Anisoptera
- Family: Aeshnidae
- Genus: Boyeria
- Species: B. grafiana

Binomial name
- Boyeria grafiana Williamson, 1907

= Boyeria grafiana =

Species of dragonfly

Boyeria grafiana, the ocellated darner, is a species of darner in the dragonfly family Aeshnidae. It is found in North America.

The IUCN conservation status of Boyeria grafiana is "LC", the least concern, with no immediate threat to the species' survival. The population is stable. The IUCN status was reviewed in 2017.
