= Crangonyx islandicus =

Scientific classification
- Domain: Eukaryota
- Kingdom: Animalia
- Phylum: Arthropoda
- Class: Malacostraca
- Order: Amphipoda
- Family: Crangonyctidae
- Genus: Crangonyx
- Species: C. islandicus

Binomial name
- Crangonyx islandicus Svavarsson & Kristjánsson, 2006

Species of crustacean

Crangonyx islandicus is a species of groundwater amphipods, endemic to Iceland, which was described in 2006. This species lives in freshwater beneath recent lava fields (no older than 10,000 years) and is relatively widespread in the geologically youngest parts of Iceland. Morphological data, species distribution, genetic diversity and population structure suggest that this species survived repeated glaciation periods in Iceland in sub-glacial refugia. Considering that this species is most closely related genetically to Crangonyx species from North America, the ancestor of C. islandicus might have colonized Iceland via Greenland.
