= Crangonyx grandimanus =

Conservation status
- Vulnerable (IUCN 2.3)

Scientific classification
- Kingdom: Animalia
- Phylum: Arthropoda
- Clade: Pancrustacea
- Class: Malacostraca
- Order: Amphipoda
- Family: Crangonyctidae
- Genus: Crangonyx
- Species: C. grandimanus

Binomial name
- Crangonyx grandimanus Bousfield, 1963

Species of crustacean

Crangonyx grandimanus is a species of crustacean in family Crangonyctidae. It is endemic to the United States.

It is under 2 cm in size, and it generally inhabits subterranean freshwater habitats near limestone bedrock. It is ovigerous and lays eggs year-round.
