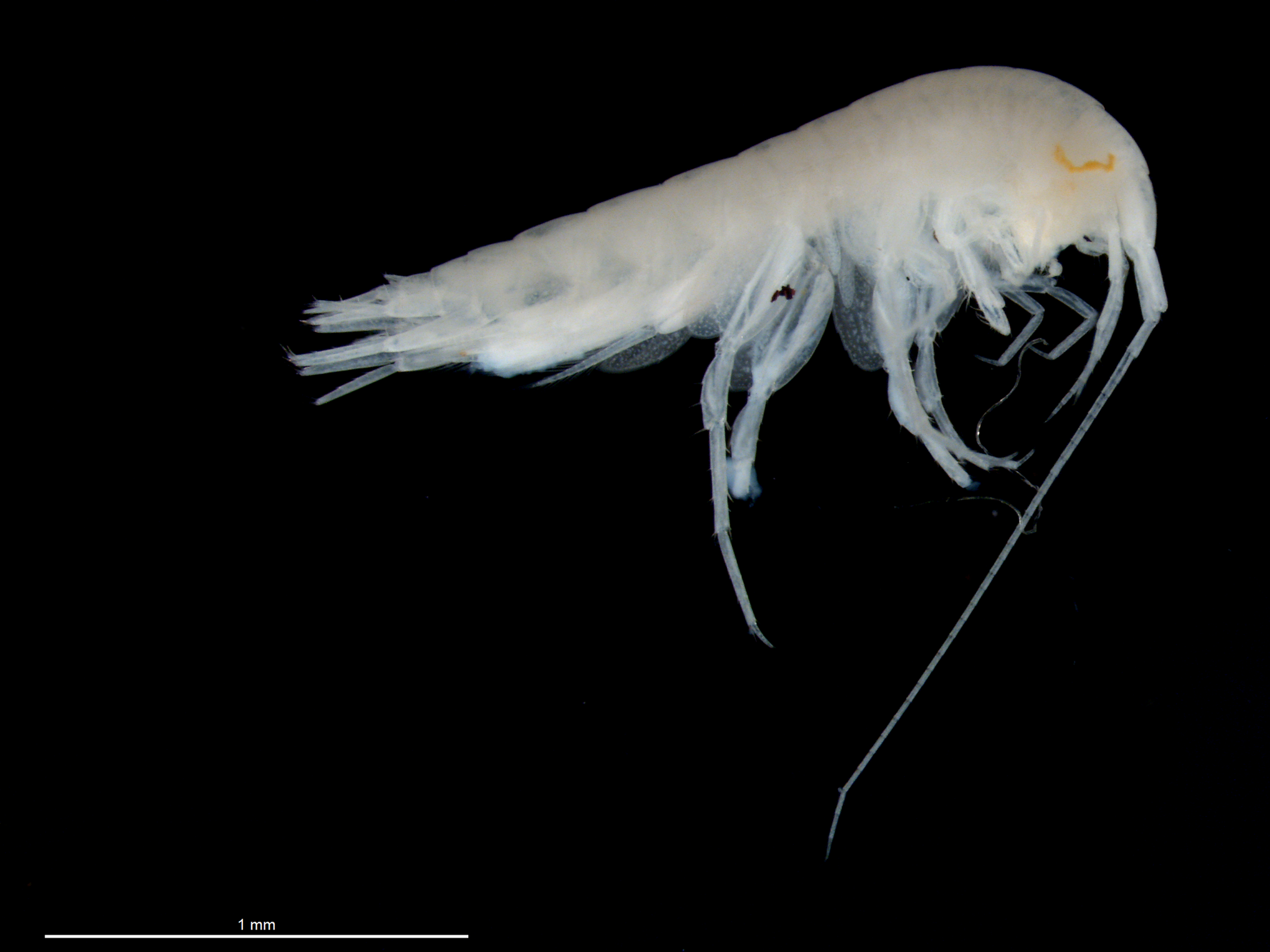

Conservation status
- Vulnerable (IUCN 2.3)

- Imperiled (NatureServe)

Scientific classification
- Kingdom: Animalia
- Phylum: Arthropoda
- Class: Malacostraca
- Order: Amphipoda
- Family: Crangonyctidae
- Genus: Crangonyx
- Species: C. hobbsi

Binomial name
- Crangonyx hobbsi Shoemaker, 1941

= Crangonyx hobbsi =

Species of crustacean

Crangonyx hobbsi is a species of troglobitic amphipod in the family Crangonyctidae. It is only known from its type locality, which is "a well, 50 feet deep, 1.5 miles northeast of Chiefland, Levy Co., Florida". It is listed as a vulnerable species on the IUCN Red List.
