= Boyeria cretensis =

Conservation status
- Endangered (IUCN 3.1)

Scientific classification
- Kingdom: Animalia
- Phylum: Arthropoda
- Clade: Pancrustacea
- Class: Insecta
- Order: Odonata
- Infraorder: Anisoptera
- Family: Aeshnidae
- Genus: Boyeria
- Species: B. cretensis

Binomial name
- Boyeria cretensis Peters, 1991

Species of dragonfly

Boyeria cretensis is one of seven species of dragonfly in genus Boyeria, which is in the family Aeshnidae. It is known commonly as the Cretan spectre and is endemic to Greece. Its natural habitat is rivers. It is threatened by habitat loss.

The Boyeria cretensis is believed to have colonized in Crete due to the separation of Crete from mainland Europe and strong wind currents that helped them travel to the island. These dragonflies prefer microhabitats as an anti drift strategy as well as to avoid predation from fish and crabs.
