= Cider Run (Sutton Creek tributary) =

River in Pennsylvania, U.S.

Physical characteristics
- Source
  - location: valley in Franklin Township, Luzerne County, Pennsylvania
  - elevation: between 1,060 and 1,080 feet (320 and 330 m)
- Mouth
  - location: Sutton Creek in Franklin Township, Luzerne County, Pennsylvania
  - coordinates: 41°23′21″N 75°52′18″W
  - elevation: 886 ft (270 m)
- Length: 2.1 mi (3.4 km)
- Basin size: 2.19 mi^{2} (5.7 km^{2})

Basin features
- Progression: Sutton Creek → Susquehanna River → Chesapeake Bay
- Tributaries
  - right: one unnamed tributary

Cider Run is a tributary of Sutton Creek in Luzerne County, Pennsylvania, in the United States. It is approximately 2.1 miles (3.4 km) long and flows through Franklin Township. The watershed of the stream has an area of 2.19 square miles (5.7 km^{2}). The stream sometimes experiences flooding, but this rarely causes significant damage. Numerous macroinvertebrate species have been observed in the creek.

== Course ==
Cider Run begins in a valley in Franklin Township near the Luzerne County/Wyoming County line. It flows east-northeast for a few tenths of a mile before turning east-southeast. After a few tenths of a mile, it turns south and its valley becomes narrower. Several tenths of a mile further downstream, the stream receives an unnamed tributary from the right and then turns southeast. After several tenths of a mile, it reaches its confluence with Sutton Creek.

Cider Run joins Sutton Creek 3.22 miles (5.18 km) upstream of its mouth.

== Hydrology ==
The peak annual discharge of Cider Run has a 10 percent chance of reaching 445 cubic feet per second (12.6 m^{3}/s). It has a 2 percent chance of reaching 812 cubic feet per second (23.0 m^{3}/s) and a 1 percent chance of reaching 1,014 cubic feet per second (28.7 m^{3}/s). The peak annual discharge has a 0.2 percent chance of reaching 1,613 cubic feet per second (45.7 m^{3}/s).

== Geography and geology ==
The elevation near the mouth of Cider Run is 886 feet (270 m) above sea level. The elevation of the stream's source is between 1,060 and 1,080 feet (320 and 330 m) above sea level.

== Watershed ==
The watershed of Cider Run has an area of 2.19 square miles (5.7 km^{2}). The mouth of the stream is in the United States Geological Survey quadrangle of Ransom. However, its source is in the quadrangle of Center Moreland. The watershed is entirely in Franklin Township, but its northern edge is near the border of Northmoreland Township, Wyoming County.

Cider Run occasionally experiences flooding. However, because its floodplain is sparsely developed, such floods rarely cause significant damage.

== History ==
Cider Run was entered into the Geographic Names Information System on August 2, 1979. Its identifier in the Geographic Names Information System is 1198571.

A bridge carrying Route 1035 over Cider Run was listed by the Pennsylvania Department of Transportation as structurally deficient. Cider Run was surveyed by the Pennsylvania Fish and Boat Commission on January 20, 2015.

== Biology ==
Cider Run is being considered for designation as a wild trout stream by the Pennsylvania Fish and Boat Commission.

There are palustrine forested wetlands along an unnamed tributary to Cider Run.

In a 2012 study, 173 individual macroinvertebrates from 20 taxa were observed on Cider Run. These taxa included four caddisfly genera, three stonefly genera, two beetle genera, and two cranefly genera. Other taxa included the aquatic worm genus Oligochaeta, the crayfish genus Orconectes, the dragonfly genus Aeshna, the hellgrammite genus Corydalus, the riffle beetle genus Dubiraphia, the scud genus Crangonyx, and the midge family Chironomidae.

== See also ==
- List of rivers of Pennsylvania
