= Crangonyx gracilis =

Scientific classification
- Domain: Eukaryota
- Kingdom: Animalia
- Phylum: Arthropoda
- Class: Malacostraca
- Order: Amphipoda
- Family: Crangonyctidae
- Genus: Crangonyx
- Species: C. gracilis

Binomial name
- Crangonyx gracilis S. I. Smith, 1871

Species of crustacean

Crangonyx gracilis, the northern lake crangonyctid, is a species of amphipod in the family Crangonyctidae. It is found in North America.
