= Florida Peninsular =

The Florida Peninsular was an early Florida newspaper in Tampa. It was established in 1853 by P. G. Wall and published by William J. Spencer. In 1873 it was reported to have 400 subscribers. Simon Turman, Jr. was an editor during the antebellum period, then Alfonso Delaunay, a postmaster, took over. Delaunay was pro-slavery and applauded extrajudicial justice in Tampa. Turman returned as editor after its publisher ousted Delaunay, who started his own paper.

Issues from 1855 until 1871 have been archived at the University of Florida library.

== Simon Turman ==
Simon B. Turman Jr. (1829 – May 22, 1864) was an early resident of Tampa, Florida. Turman's father, Simon B. Turman, Sr., was from Ohio and a pioneer in Palmetto, Florida.

Simon, Jr., came from Indiana to Florida in 1843, and to Tampa in 1845. His married Meroba Hooker in 1847. She helped maintain Oaklawn Cemetery. They had one son, named for his brother, Solon B. Turman's sister Mary married John A. Henderson.

Simon, Jr., served as a probate judge and newspaper editor at the Florida Peninsular newspaper. On the eve of the Civil War, he attended the Florida Secession Convention as a representative of Hillsborough County along with James Gettis and signed the Ordinance of Secession. He was a casualty of the war, dying in Georgia.
