= Cummings Pond =

- Location within Pennsylvania Location within the United States
- Location: Franklin Township, Luzerne County, Pennsylvania
- Coordinates: 41°23′50″N 75°54′50″W
- Type: glacial lake
- Primary inflows: none (fed by springs)
- Primary outflows: unnamed tributary to Sutton Creek
- Catchment area: 0.5 square miles (1.3 km^{2})
- Max. length: 2,000 feet (610 m)
- Max. width: 1,350 feet (410 m)
- Surface area: 43.8 acres (17.7 ha)
- Max. depth: 10 feet (3.0 m)
- Water volume: 46,000,000 US gallons (170,000 m^{3})
- Surface elevation: 1,191 feet (363 m)

Cummings Pond is a lake in Luzerne County, Pennsylvania, in the United States. It has a surface area of more than 40 acres (16 ha) and is located in Franklin Township. The lake is fed by springs and an unnamed tributary of Sutton Creek flow from it. It is up to 10 feet (3.0 m) deep, though it was deeper in the past. The lake was formed approximately 27,000 years ago by glacial action. It was historically stocked with fish and cattails and alders occur in its vicinity. In the early 1900s, the lake was used for boating, fishing, and ice harvesting.

== Geography and geology ==
Cummings Pond has no inlets, but is fed by various springs. The main outflow of the lake is an unnamed tributary of Sutton Creek. This tributary has a clean channel is approximately 5 feet (1.5 m) wide and 1 foot (0.30 m) deep. The elevation of the reservoir is 1,191 feet (363 m) above sea level.

Cummings Pond is a natural lake and had no dam in the early 1900s. It has a regular, oval shape. The lake's maximum width is 1,350 feet (410 m) and its maximum length is 2,000 feet (610 m). It has a surface area of 43.8 acres (17.7 ha) and a volume of 46 million gallons. The depth in most of the lake is 5 feet (1.5 m), but the deepest parts can reach 10 feet (3.0 m). The lake was originally close to 16 feet (4.9 m) deep.

Cummings Pond is approximately 27,000 years old and is in a depression cut in hard shale by glacial action. The lake mostly retains its original shape. Up to 30 feet (9.1 m) of sediment is under the lake.

On three sides, Cummings Pond is surrounded by hills that rise 250 feet (76 m) above the lake. One side of the lake was highly marshy in the early 1900s.

== Watershed and biology ==
The watershed of Cummings Pond has an area of 0.5 square miles (1.3 km^{2}). In the early 1900s, the watershed consisted entirely of second-growth forest. Cummings Pond is entirely within the United States Geological Survey quadrangle of Center Moreland.

Cummings Pond was stocked with yellow perch in the 1930s. The lake is in the C-1 Conservation district, whose purpose is to protect it and other hydrological features. Cattails and alders occur in the vicinity of the lake.

== History and recreation ==
Cummings Pond was entered into the Geographic Names Information System on August 2, 1979. Its identifier in the Geographic Names Information System is 1198628.

In the early 1900s, a public road ran parallel to Cummings Pond 20 feet (6.1 m) above the lake. A farmhouse was also located near the lake, 25 feet (7.6 m) above the water line. During this time period, it was used for boating and fishing, as well as a private ice supply. Its ownership was claimed by Daniel B. Winters.

Cummings Pond is navigable with rowboats. A privately run campground with an area of 21 acres (8.5 ha) is located on the lake.

== See also ==
- List of lakes in Pennsylvania
