= Upper Exeter, Pennsylvania =

Unincorporated community in Pennsylvania, US

- Census-designated place
- PA 92 in Upper Exeter

- Location within the state of Pennsylvania Upper Exeter (the United States)
- Coordinates: 41°24′25″N 75°50′15″W
- Country: United States
- State: Pennsylvania
- County: Luzerne
- Township: Exeter

Area
  - Total: 2.0 sq mi (5.3 km^{2})
  - Land: 2.0 sq mi (5.1 km^{2})
  - Water: 0.077 sq mi (0.2 km^{2})

Population (2010)
  - Total: 707
  - Density: 360/sq mi (140/km^{2})
- Time zone: UTC-5 (Eastern (EST))
  - Summer (DST): UTC-4 (EDT)
- Area code: 570

Upper Exeter is a census-designated place (CDP) in Exeter Township, Luzerne County, Pennsylvania, United States. It is the northernmost community in Luzerne County. The population was 707 at the 2010 census.

== Geography ==
Upper Exeter is located at 41°24′25″N 75°50′15″W, along Pennsylvania Route 92 in the northern part of Exeter Township. It is situated on the west bank of the Susquehanna River, approximately 6 miles (10 km) north of Pittston.

According to the United States Census Bureau, the CDP has a total area of 2.0 square miles (5.3 km^{2}), of which 2.0 square miles (5.1 km^{2}) is land and 0.077 square miles (0.2 km^{2}), or 4.46%, is water.

Exeter Township Municipal Building in the Village of Upper Exeter

== Education ==
It is in the Wyoming Area School District.
