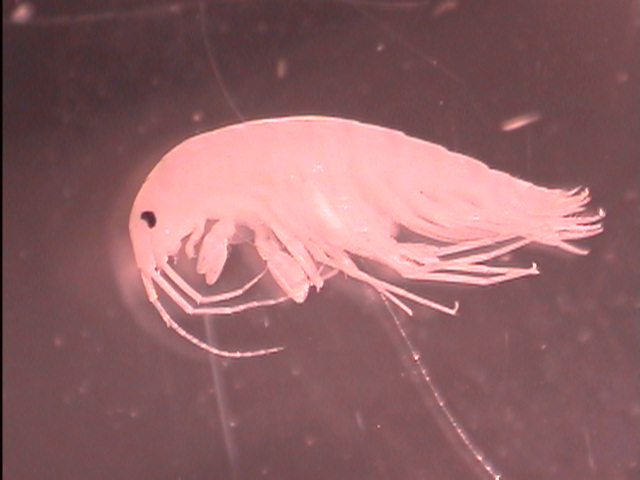

Scientific classification
- Domain: Eukaryota
- Kingdom: Animalia
- Phylum: Arthropoda
- Class: Malacostraca
- Order: Amphipoda
- Family: Crangonyctidae
- Genus: Crangonyx; Bate, 1859

= Crangonyx =

Genus of crustaceans

Crangonyx is a genus of crustacean in family Crangonyctidae. Crangonyx species can live in marshes, savannas or swamps as well as caves. It contains the following species:

- Crangonyx aberrans S. I. Smith, 1983
- Crangonyx acicularis Zhang & Holsinger, 2003
- Crangonyx africanus Missouli, 2006
- Crangonyx aka Zhang & Holsinger, 2003
- Crangonyx alpinus Bousfield, 1983
- Crangonyx anomalus Hubricht, 1943
- Crangonyx antennatus Cope & Packard, 1881
- Crangonyx arsenjevi (Derzjavin, 1927)
- Crangonyx baculispina Zhang & Holsinger, 2003
- Crangonyx barri Zhang & Holsinger, 2003
- Crangonyx bousfieldi Zhang & Holsinger, 2003
- Crangonyx caecus Zhang & Holsinger, 2003
- Crangonyx castellanum Zhang & Holsinger, 2003
- Crangonyx chlebnikovi Borutzky, 1928
- Crangonyx consimilis Zhang & Holsinger, 2003
- Crangonyx cooperi Zhang & Holsinger, 2003
- Crangonyx cornutus Zhang & Holsinger, 2003
- Crangonyx dearolfi Shoemaker, 1942
- Crangonyx disjunctus Zhang & Holsinger, 2003
- Crangonyx ermannii (Milne-Edwards, 1840)
- Crangonyx floridanus Bousfield, 1963
- Crangonyx fontinalis Zhang & Holsinger, 2003
- Crangonyx forbesi (Hubricht & Mackin, 1940)
- Crangonyx gracilis S. I. Smith, 1871
- Crangonyx grandimanus Bousfield, 1963
- Crangonyx hobbsi Shoemaker in Ellis, 1941
- Crangonyx hubrichti Zhang & Holsinger, 2003
- Crangonyx indianensis Zhang & Holsinger, 2003
- Crangonyx insolitus Zhang & Holsinger, 2003
- Crangonyx islandicus Svavarsson & Kristjánsson, 2006
- Crangonyx lewisi Zhang & Holsinger, 2003
- Crangonyx longicarpus Zhang & Holsinger, 2003
- Crangonyx longidactylus Zhang & Holsinger, 2003
- Crangonyx minor Bousfield, 1958
- Crangonyx montanus Zhang & Holsinger, 2003
- Crangonyx obliquus (Hubricht & Mackin, 1940)
- Crangonyx occidentalis Hubricht & Harrison, 1941
- Crangonyx ohioensis Zhang & Holsinger, 2003
- Crangonyx orientalis Zhang & Holsinger, 2003
- Crangonyx packardi S. I. Smith, 1888
- Crangonyx palustris Zhang & Holsinger, 2003
- Crangonyx paxi Schellenberg, 1942
- Crangonyx pseudogracilis Bousfield, 1958
- Crangonyx richmondensis Ellis, 1941
- Crangonyx rivularis Bousfield, 1958
- Crangonyx serratus (Embody, 1910)
- Crangonyx setodactylus Bousfield, 1958
- Crangonyx shoemakeri Hubricht & Mackin, 1940
- Crangonyx specus Zhang & Holsinger, 2003
- Crangonyx stagnicolous Zhang & Holsinger, 2003
- Crangonyx subterraneus Bate, 1859
