= Étienne Laurent Joseph Hippolyte Boyer de Fonscolombe =

- Born: 22 July 1772; Aix-en-Provence, Province of Provence, France
- Died: 13 February 1853 (aged 80); Aix-en-Provence, Bouches-du-Rhône, Provence-Alpes-Côte d'Azur, France
- Occupation: Entomologist

Étienne-Laurent-Joseph-Hippolyte Boyer de Fonscolombe (22 July 1772, Aix-en-Provence – 13 February 1853, Aix) was a French entomologist who specialised in Coleoptera and Hymenoptera and pest insects.

== Biography ==
=== Early life ===
Étienne Joseph Hippolyte Boyer de Fonscolombe on 22 July 1772 in Aix-en-Provence, France. He was the son of Emmanuel Honoré Hippolyte de Boyer (1744, Aix, Saint-Sauveur-1810) an aristocrat who studied agronomy, writing on this subject in the Mémoires de l'académie d'Aix. He was educated at the Collège de Juilly.

=== Career ===
Upon finishing his education in 1789, "he had attended meetings of the Constituent Assembly in Versailles, with Mirabeau." He was later "Locked up as suspect" (1793–94). These were dangerous times-his father was also imprisoned in the Terror. On his release and marriage he lived with his parents and his mother-in-law at the castle of Montvert.

With the death of his father in 1810, he rented a floor of the hotel of Aix and the couple lived with his mother, who found him "Entomologiste très remarquable avec l’intelligence, la bonté, la vertu et le savoir" (a remarkable entomologist with intelligence, kindness, virtue and knowledge). Hippolyte and his brother Marcellin de Fonscolombe never ceased occupying themselves with the natural sciences "like those of antiquity and on medals".

From 1833, he entrusted the management of the Fonscolombe estates to his son-in-law, Adolphe de Saporta, and in 1848 he sold Montvert when it was left to his wife. He was then able to devote himself entirely to entomology. Following his father he published most of his work in Mémoires de l'académie d'Aix

=== Death ===
He died on 13 February 1853 in Aix-en-Provence.

== Legacy ==
Much of his collection is in the Muséum national d'histoire naturelle in Paris and there are some Apoidea in the Hope Department of Entomology in Oxford.

== Works ==
- Monographia chalciditum galloprovinciae circa aquas degentum. Annales des Sciences Naturelles (1) (Zoologie) 26: 273–307.
- 1840 Addenda et errata ad monographium chalciditum galloprovinciae ciria aquas sextias degentum. Annales des Sciences Naturelles (2) 13: 186–192.
- 1840 Des insectes nuisibles à l'agriculture principalement dans les départements du midi de la France Mémoires de l'Académie de Sciences d'Aix 5 pp. 5–225.

== See also ==
- Aphis nerii
