= Exeter Township, Luzerne County, Pennsylvania =

Township in Pennsylvania, US

Coordinates: 41°22′00″N 75°49′59″W

- Township
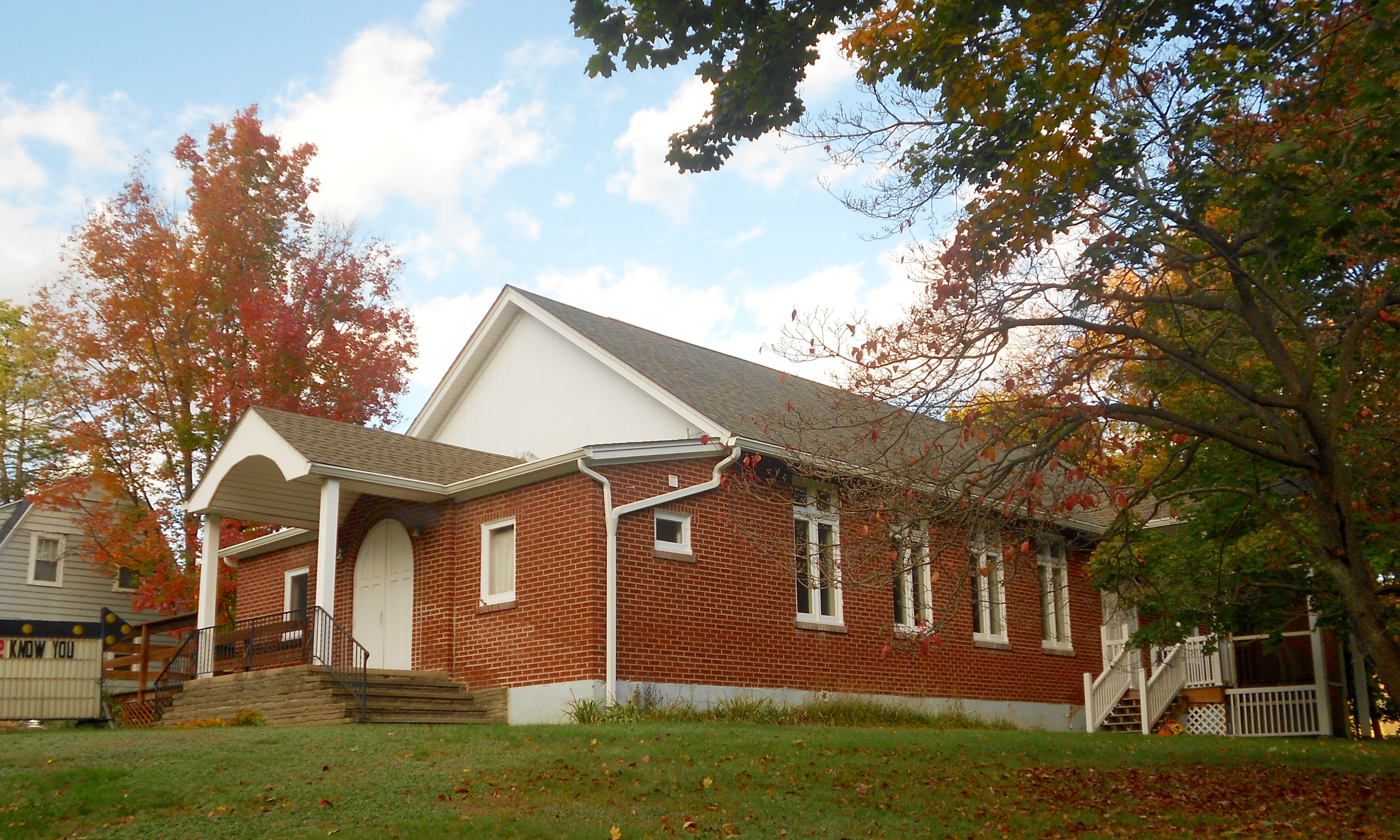
- Harding Church of Christ

- Logo

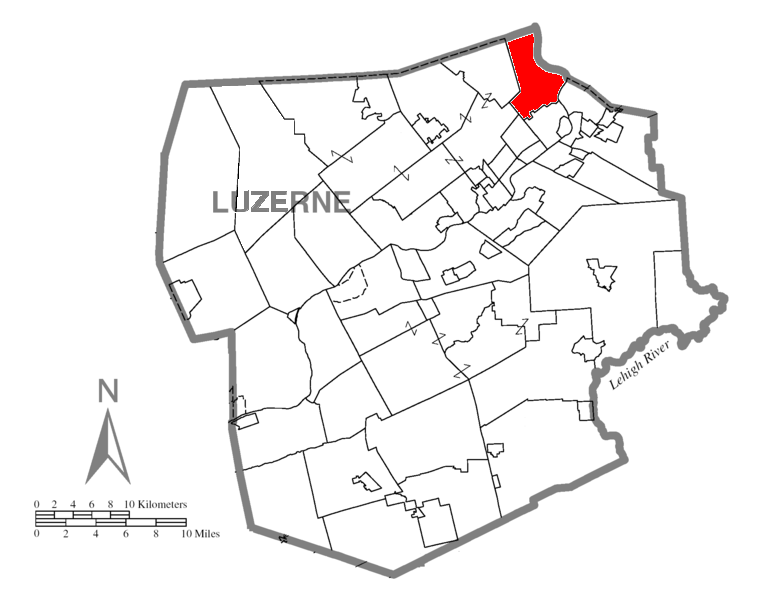
- Map of Luzerne County highlighting Exeter Township

- Map of Pennsylvania highlighting Luzerne County
- Country: United States
- State: Pennsylvania
- County: Luzerne
- Region: Greater Pittston

Government
  - Type: Second Class Township
  - Chairman: Donald Hoffman

Area
  - Total: 13.47 sq mi (34.90 km^{2})
  - Land: 13.00 sq mi (33.66 km^{2})
  - Water: 0.48 sq mi (1.24 km^{2})

Population (2020)
  - Total: 2,047 ▼
  - Estimate (2021): 2,051
  - Density: 180.8/sq mi (69.79/km^{2})
- Time zone: UTC-5 (Eastern (EST))
  - Summer (DST): UTC-4 (EDT)
- Area code: 570
- FIPS code: 42-079-24400
- Website: exetertwp.net

Exeter Township is a township within the Greater Pittston area of Luzerne County, Pennsylvania, United States. The population was 2,047 at the 2020 census. Upper Exeter and Harding are two villages in the township.

== History ==
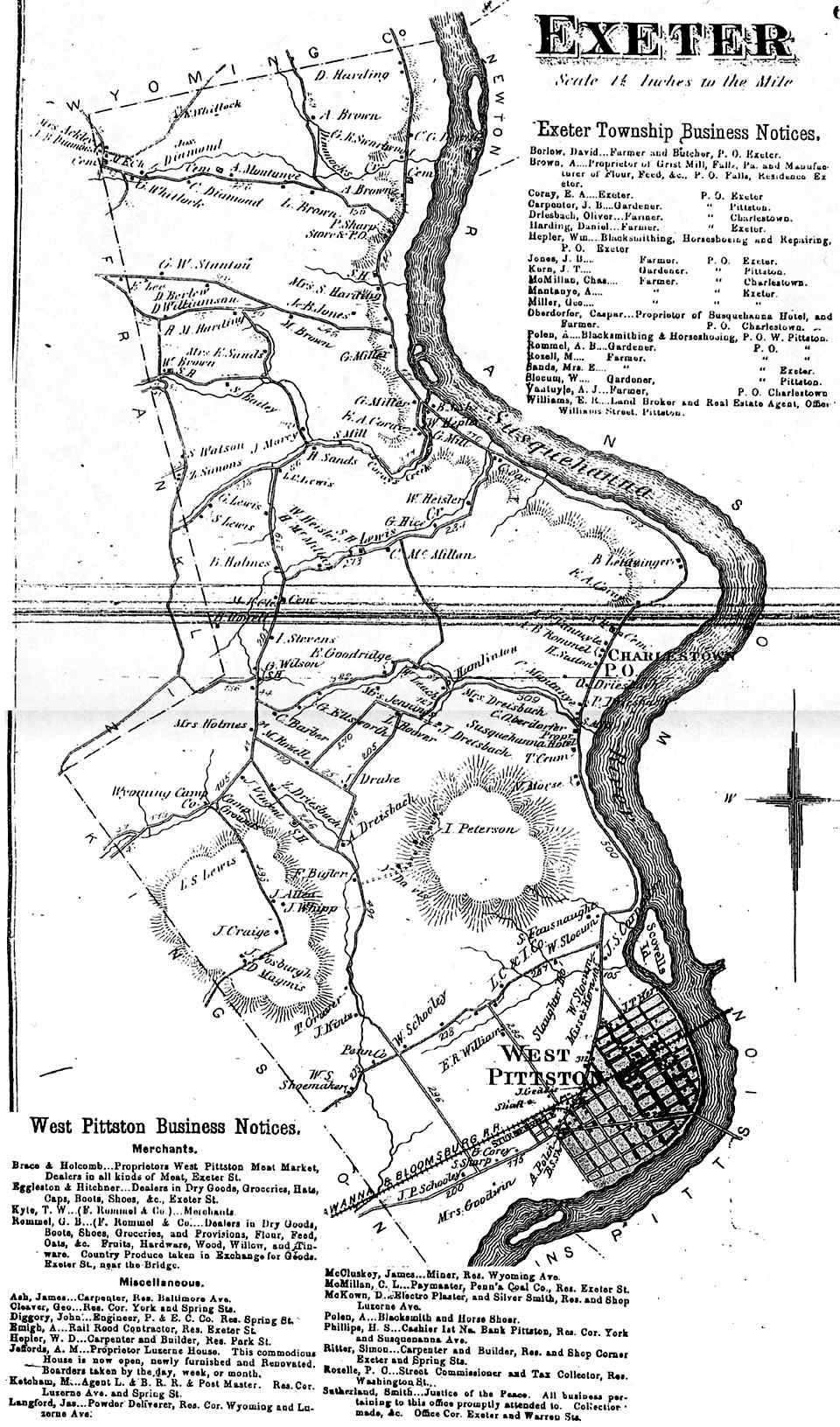
An old map of Exeter Township, Luzerne County

=== Early history ===
Exeter Township was established in the late 18th century as one of the original townships of Luzerne County. It is believed to be named after Exeter, Rhode Island; the name Exeter derives from the town of Exeter in Devon, England. Exeter Township was later downsized when sections of the community were divided into several newer townships and boroughs (e.g., West Pittston Borough and Exeter Borough).

=== Revolutionary War ===
During the Revolutionary War, the Hardings—a group of settlers from Exeter Township—were ambushed by a group of Iroquois and Loyalists on June 28, 1778. Five days later, on July 3, the Battle of Wyoming, also known as the Wyoming Massacre, occurred in what is now Exeter Borough and Wyoming Borough. Roughly 300 Patriot soldiers were killed. In the days following the battle, settlers fled the Wyoming Valley and spread the news of how the Patriots had been massacred.

In response, a scorched earth campaign was conducted by Continental Army forces under the command of Major General John Sullivan). The 1779 Sullivan Expedition destroyed numerous Iroquois villages in the Finger Lakes region of New York.

=== After the war ===
In the following decades (after the Revolutionary War), American settlers poured into Exeter. Farming and logging were the primary professions in the township. Sawmills and gristmills were constructed along creeks throughout the community.

== Geography ==
According to the United States Census Bureau, the township has a total area of 13.5 square miles (34.9 km^{2}), of which 13.0 square miles (33.7 km^{2}) is land and 0.46 square miles (1.2 km^{2}), or 3.56%, is water. The township lies on the western bank of the Susquehanna River. It is made up of forests and farms. The township contains two major villages: Harding (in the south) and Upper Exeter (in the north). Both villages are located along the only major highway in the township—PA 92 (which runs north to south along the Susquehanna River).

== Demographics ==
Historical population
Census	Pop.	Note	%±
2000	2,557		—
2010	2,378		−7.0%
2020	2,047		−13.9%
2021 (est.)	2,051		0.2%

As of the census of 2000, there were 2,557 people, 943 households, and 729 families residing in the township. The population density was 198.5 inhabitants per square mile (76.6/km^{2}). There were 1,038 housing units at an average density of 80.6 per square mile (31.1/km^{2}). The racial makeup of the township was 99.30% White, 0.08% African American, 0.04% Native American, 0.08% Asian, 0.16% Pacific Islander, 0.31% from other races, and 0.04% from two or more races. Hispanic or Latino of any race were 0.35% of the population.

There were 943 households, out of which 34.8% had children under the age of 18 living with them, 67.0% were married couples living together, 6.7% had a female householder with no husband present, and 22.6% were non-families. 18.2% of all households were made up of individuals, and 7.5% had someone living alone who was 65 years of age or older. The average household size was 2.71 and the average family size was 3.10.

In the township the population was spread out, with 24.3% under the age of 18, 5.9% from 18 to 24, 32.0% from 25 to 44, 26.8% from 45 to 64, and 11.0% who were 65 years of age or older. The median age was 38 years. For every 100 females, there were 101.0 males. For every 100 females age 18 and over, there were 101.0 males.

The median income for a household in the township was $43,600, and the median income for a family was $49,722. Males had a median income of $33,547 versus $25,428 for females. The per capita income for the township was $18,134. About 4.5% of families and 6.1% of the population were below the poverty line, including 7.0% of those under age 18 and 12.7% of those age 65 or over.

== Education ==
Exeter Township is part of Wyoming Area School District.
