= Mossville =

Mossville may refer to a place in the United States:

- Mossville, Arkansas
- Mossville, Illinois
- Mossville, Louisiana
- Mossville, Pennsylvania
