= Fairmount Township, Pennsylvania =

Township in Pennsylvania, US

Coordinates: 41°19′00″N 76°16′59″W

- Township
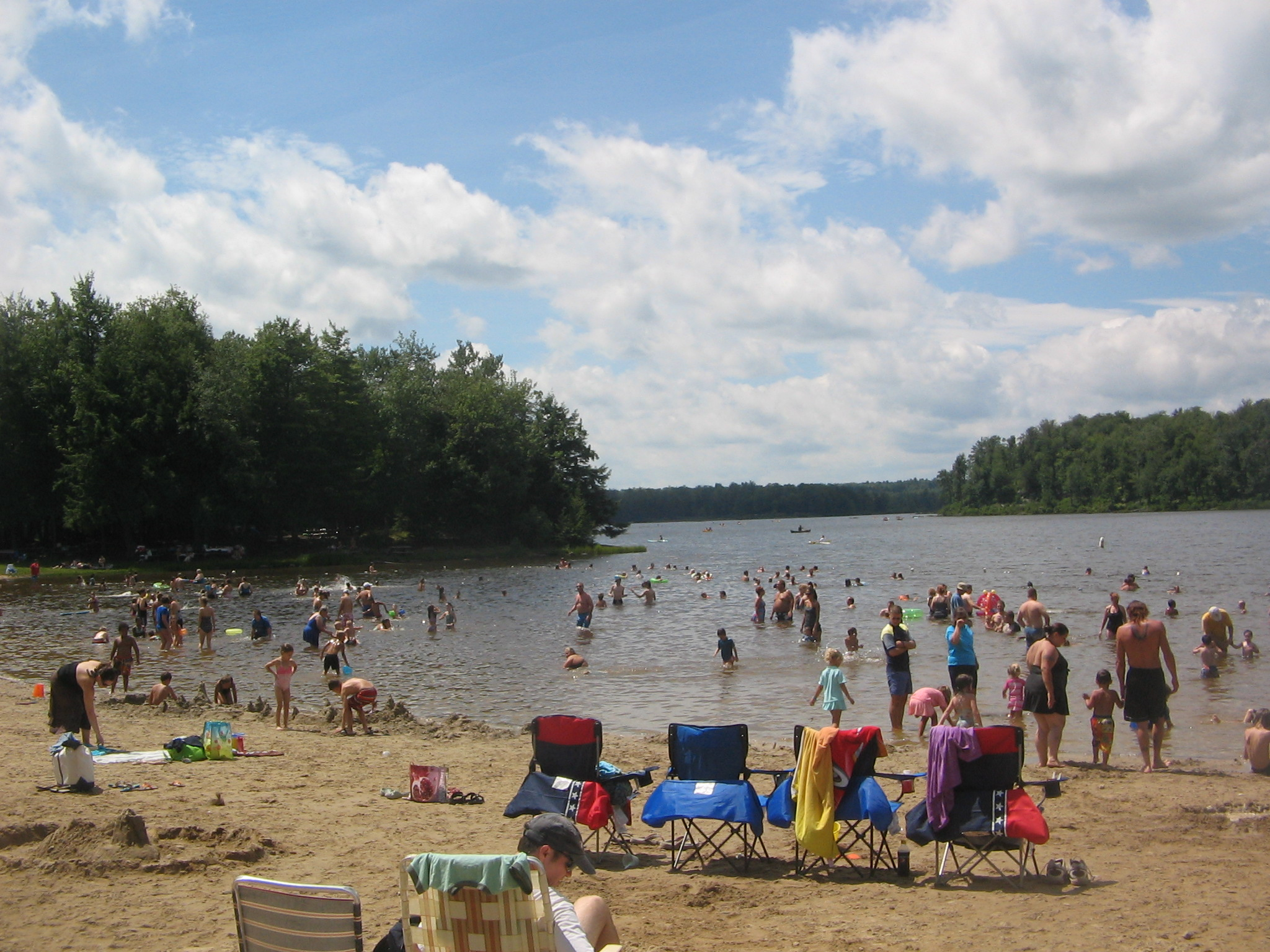
- Beach on Lake Jean in Ricketts Glen State Park, Fairmount Township

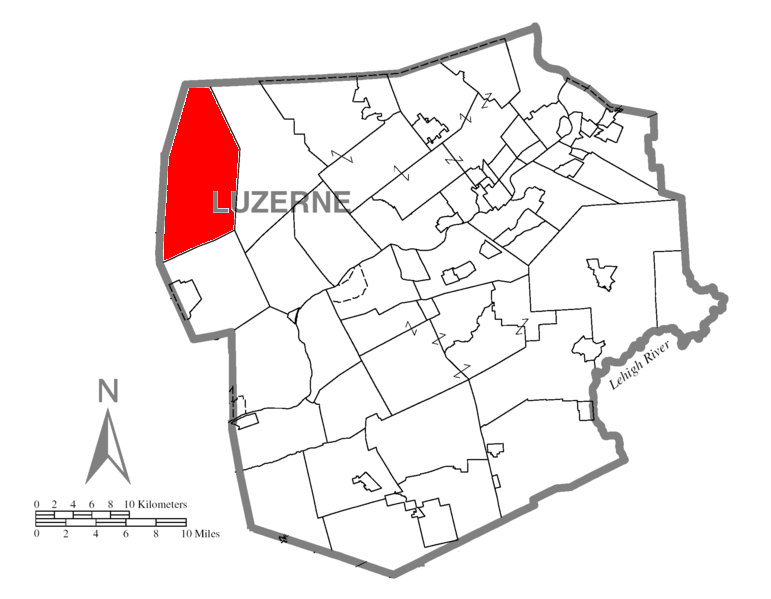
- Map of Luzerne County highlighting Fairmount Township

- Map of Pennsylvania highlighting Luzerne County
- Country: United States
- State: Pennsylvania
- County: Luzerne

Area
  - Total: 46.21 sq mi (119.68 km^{2})
  - Land: 45.71 sq mi (118.39 km^{2})
  - Water: 0.49 sq mi (1.28 km^{2})

Population (2020)
  - Total: 1,207 ▼
  - Estimate (2021): 1,209
  - Density: 27.4/sq mi (10.59/km^{2})
- Time zone: UTC-5 (Eastern (EST))
  - Summer (DST): UTC-4 (EDT)
- FIPS code: 42-079-24752

Fairmount Township is a township in Luzerne County, Pennsylvania, United States. The population was 1,207 at the 2020 census. Fairmount Township is home to Ricketts Glen State Park. The park receives tens of thousands of visitors each year.

== History ==
=== Early history ===
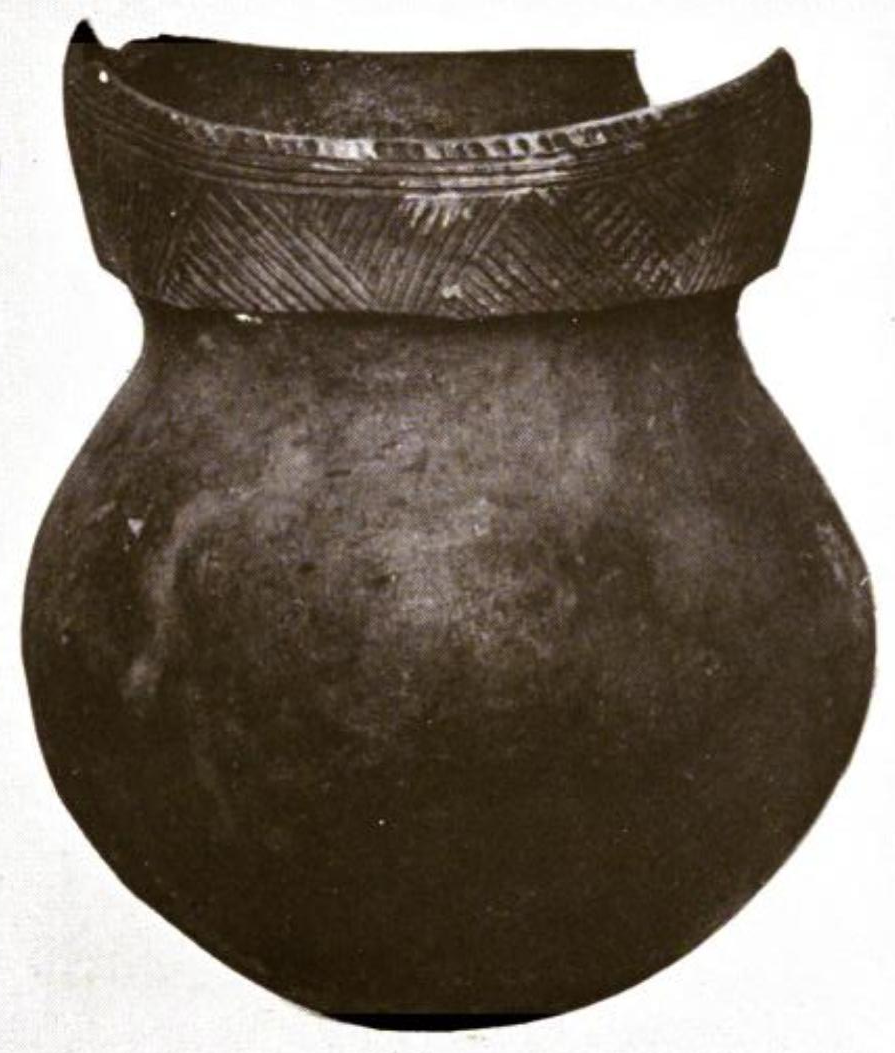
Native American pot found along Kitchen Creek (c. 1890)

Fairmount Township is in Pennsylvania, where humans have lived since at least 10000 BC. The first settlers in the state were Paleo-Indian nomadic hunters known from their stone tools. The hunter-gatherers of the Archaic period, which lasted locally from 7000 to 1000 BC, used a greater variety of more sophisticated stone artifacts. The Woodland period marked the gradual transition to semi-permanent villages and horticulture, between 1000 BC and 1500 AD. Archeological evidence found in the state from this time includes a range of pottery types and styles, burial mounds, pipes, bows and arrows, and ornaments.

Fairmount Township is in the Susquehanna River drainage basin, the earliest recorded inhabitants of which were the Iroquoian-speaking Susquehannocks. They were a matriarchal society that lived in stockaded villages of large longhouses, but their numbers were greatly reduced by disease and warfare with the Five Nations of the Iroquois, and by 1675 they had died out, moved away, or been assimilated into other tribes.

After the demise of the Susquehannocks, the lands of the Susquehanna River valley were under the nominal control of the Iroquois, who also lived in longhouses, primarily in what is now the state of New York. The Iroquois had a strong confederacy which gave them power beyond their numbers. To fill the void left by the demise of the Susquehannocks, the Iroquois encouraged displaced tribes from the east to settle in the Susquehanna watershed, including the Shawnee and Lenape (or Delaware).

The French and Indian War (1754–1763) and subsequent colonial expansion encouraged the migration of many Native Americans westward to the Ohio River basin. On November 5, 1768, the British acquired land, known in Pennsylvania as the New Purchase, from the Iroquois in the Treaty of Fort Stanwix; this included what is now Fairmount Township. After the American Revolutionary War, Native Americans almost entirely left Pennsylvania. In 1890, a Native American pot, decorated in the style of "the peoples of the Susquehanna region," was found under a rock ledge on Kitchen Creek by Murray Reynolds.

=== Township ===
The first Europeans came to the region in the 18th century. The first settler in the township was John Franklin of Connecticut. Additional settlers followed in Franklin's footsteps (e.g., Levi Seward and Nathaniel Goss). Under the Connecticut title—previous to 1776—it was originally known as Bloomingdale Township. The name was changed to Huntington Township in 1799 in honor of Samuel Huntington, a native of Connecticut and one of the signers of the Declaration of Independence. Fairmount Township broke away from Huntington Township in the 1830s; it was officially incorporated as a township in 1834.

== Geography ==
According to the United States Census Bureau, the township has a total area of 46.2 square miles (119.7 km^{2}), of which 45.7 square miles (118.4 km^{2}) is land and 0.50 square miles (1.3 km^{2}), or 1.07%, is water. It is located in the northwestern corner of Luzerne County. The northern portion of Fairmount Township is mostly made up of mountains, lakes, streams, and thick forests. Ricketts Glen State Park is located in this half of the township. The southern half of Fairmount Township consists mostly of farmland and forests; the villages of Mossville and Rittenhouse are located in this part of the township. PA 118 and PA 487 intersect in the western part of the township in the village of Red Rock.

=== Ricketts Glen State Park ===
Much of Ricketts Glen State Park is in Fairmount Township. The park offers hiking, camping, horseback riding, and hunting. Lake Jean is used for swimming, fishing, canoeing, and kayaking. In winter there is cross-country skiing, ice fishing on the lake, and ice climbing on the frozen falls. Almost all of Kitchen Creek and the 24 named waterfalls are in the township.

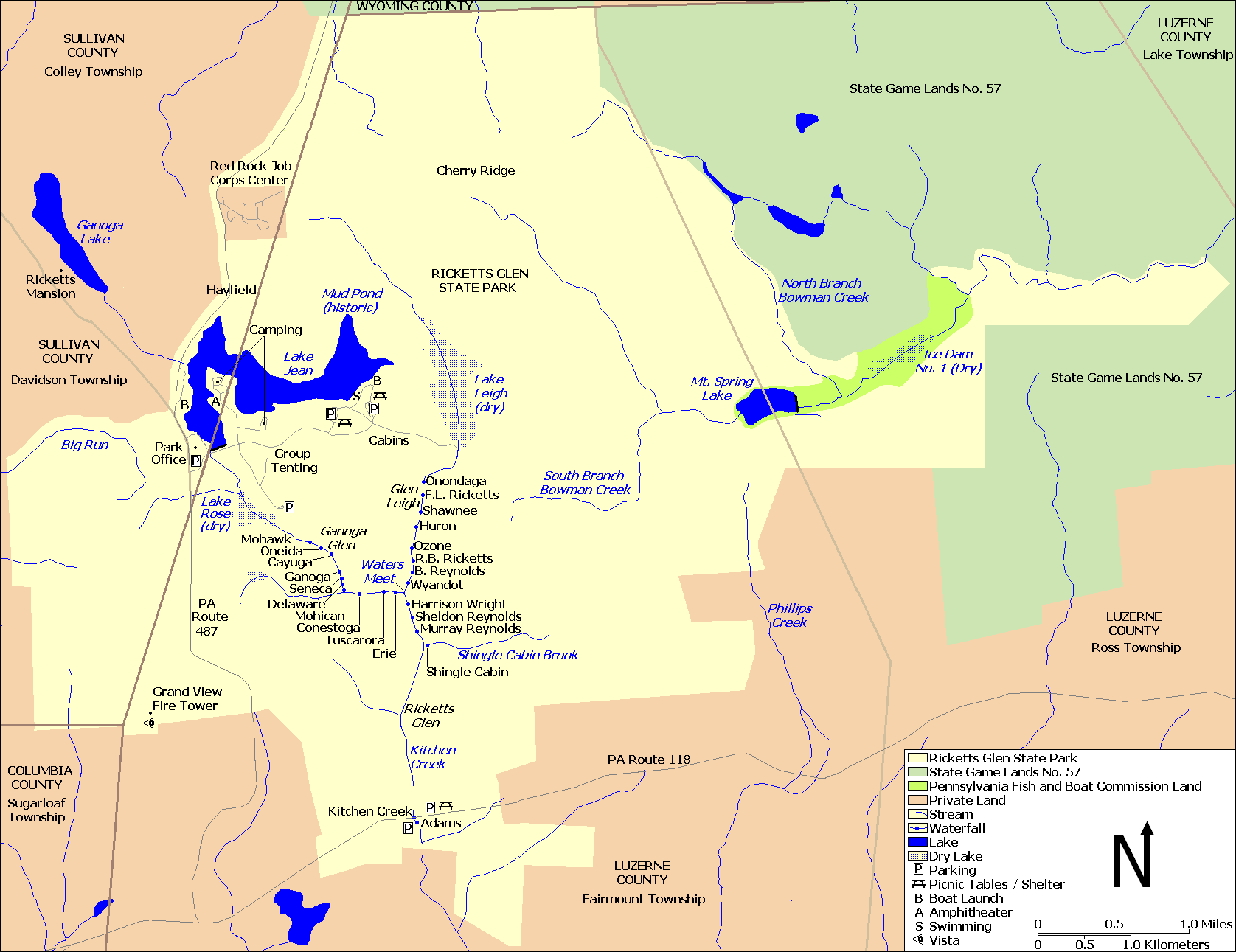
Map of Ricketts Glen State Park (in northern Fairmount Township)

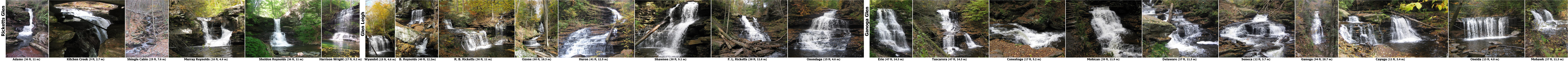
There are 24 named waterfalls in Fairmount Township.

== Demographics ==
Historical population
Census	Pop.	Note	%±
2000	1,226		—
2010	1,276		4.1%
2020	1,207		−5.4%
2021 (est.)	1,209		0.2%

As of the census of 2000, there were 1,226 people, 490 households, and 347 families residing in the township. The population density was 26.9 inhabitants per square mile (10.4/km^{2}). There were 598 housing units at an average density of 13.1/sq mi (5.1/km^{2}). The racial makeup of the township was 97.72% White, 0.57% African American, 0.98% Native American, 0.16% Asian, 0.08% Pacific Islander, and 0.49% from two or more races. Hispanic or Latino of any race were 0.33% of the population.

There were 490 households, out of which 28.6% had children under the age of 18 living with them, 61.6% were married couples living together, 5.1% had a female householder with no husband present, and 29.0% were non-families. 25.9% of all households were made up of individuals, and 10.8% had someone living alone who was 65 years of age or older. The average household size was 2.50 and the average family size was 2.99.

In the township the population was spread out, with 24.1% under the age of 18, 7.5% from 18 to 24, 28.6% from 25 to 44, 25.4% from 45 to 64, and 14.4% who were 65 years of age or older. The median age was 40 years. For every 100 females, there were 106.7 males. For every 100 females age 18 and over, there were 106.4 males.

The median income for a household in the township was $37,656, and the median income for a family was $45,208. Males had a median income of $31,979 versus $21,103 for females. The per capita income for the township was $16,334. About 7.4% of families and 10.1% of the population were below the poverty line, including 18.3% of those under age 18 and 9.4% of those age 65 or over.
