= Lake Jean =

Lake in Pennsylvania, United States

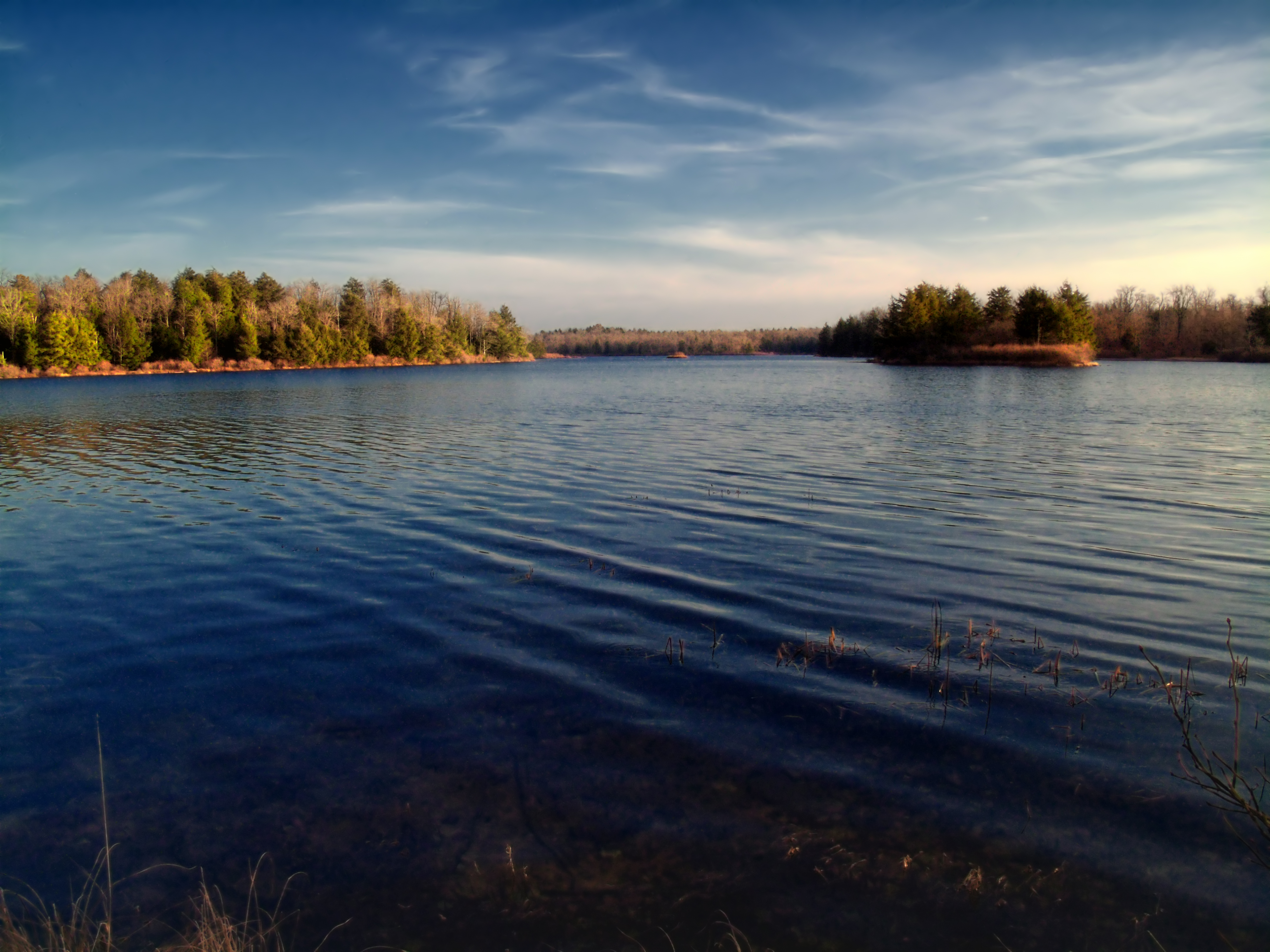
- Lake Jean

- Location within Pennsylvania Location within the United States
- Location: Fairmount Township, Luzerne County, Pennsylvania; Colley Township, Sullivan County, Pennsylvania
- Coordinates: 41°20′28″N 76°17′27″W
- Etymology: Jean Holberton Ricketts
- Primary inflows: outlet of Ganoga Lake (main inflow)
- Primary outflows: unnamed tributary of Kitchen Creek
- Catchment area: 1,998 acres (809 ha)
- Max. length: up to 10,560 feet (3,220 m)
- Max. width: up to 1,980 feet (600 m)
- Surface area: 245 acres (99 ha)
- Average depth: 5.9 feet (1.8 m)
- Max. depth: up to 20 feet (6.1 m)
- Water volume: 486 million US gallons (1.84 hm^{3})
- Residence time: 0.6 years

Lake Jean is a lake in Luzerne County and Sullivan County, in Pennsylvania, in the United States. It has a surface area of approximately 245 acres (99 ha) and is situated in Colley Township, Sullivan County and Fairmount Township, Luzerne County. The lake's main inflow is the outlet of Ganoga Lake. Lake Jean is fairly shallow, with an average depth of 5.9 feet (1.8 m). It is in the watershed of Fishing Creek. The main rock formations in the lake's watershed include Burgoon Sandstone and the Mauch Chunk Formation. The lake is dammed by the Lake Jean Dam and is owned by the Pennsylvania Department of Conservation and Natural Resources.

Lake Jean historically had a low pH due to impairment by atmospheric deposition. The lake has become less acidic, but continues to be impaired by mercury. Its watershed has an area of 1,998 acres (809 ha), including the lake itself. The majority of the watershed is forested, though there are a few other land uses. The lake was named by Colonel R. Bruce Ricketts in 1905 after Jean Holberton Ricketts, his eldest daughter. A new dam was created for it in the 1950s. In 2015, the lake was partially drained so that repair work could be done on the control tower of the Lake Jean Dam.

Lake Jean is stocked with trout and contains various species of warmwater game fish and panfish. The large tracts of forest in the lake's watershed are mainly deciduous, but there is some coniferous forest. The lake is listed on the Luzerne County Natural Areas Inventory. Its main uses are recreation and fishing and it is one of the common destinations of visitors to Ricketts Glen State Park, in which it is located.

== Geography ==
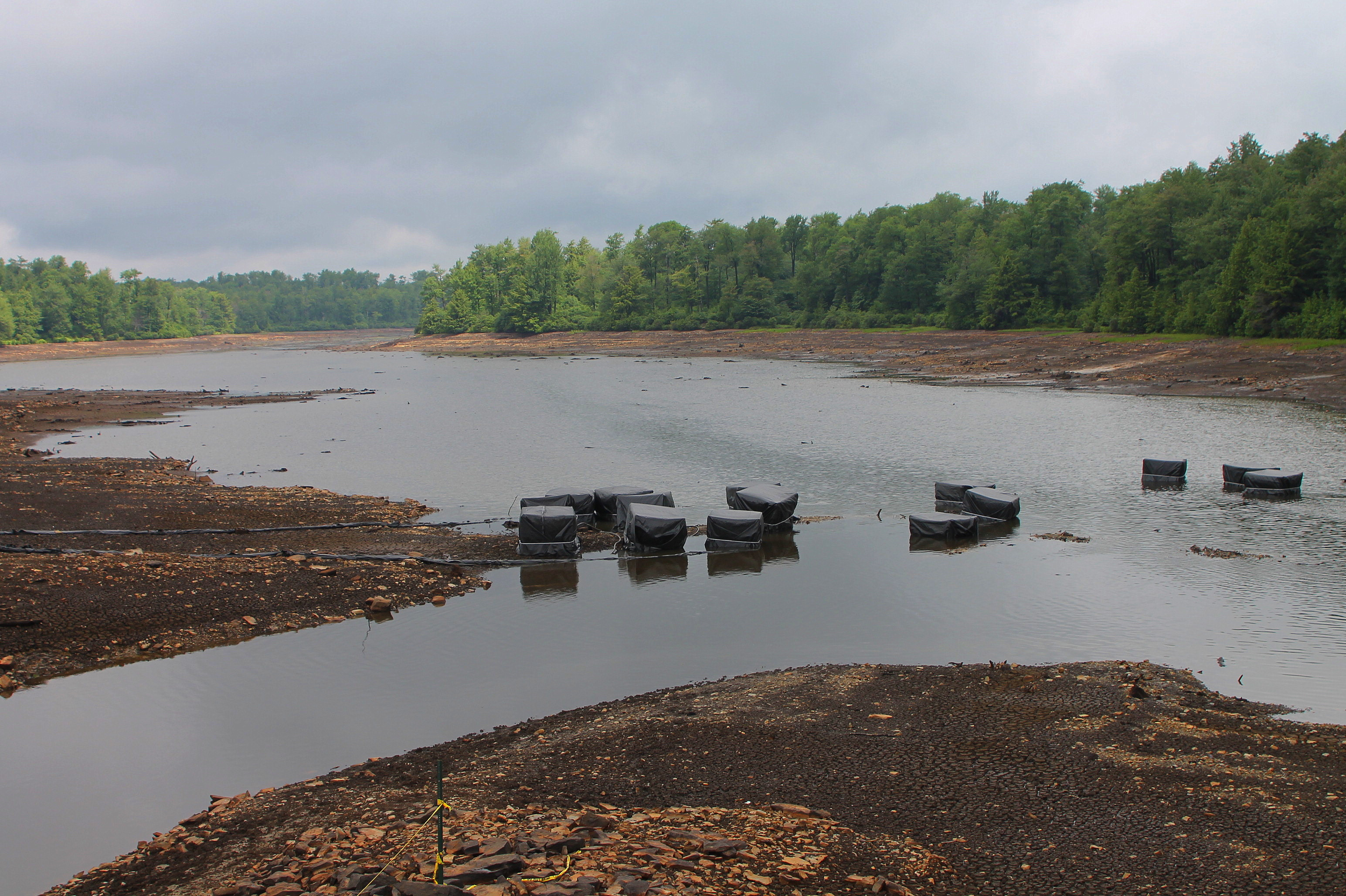
Lake Jean in June 2015

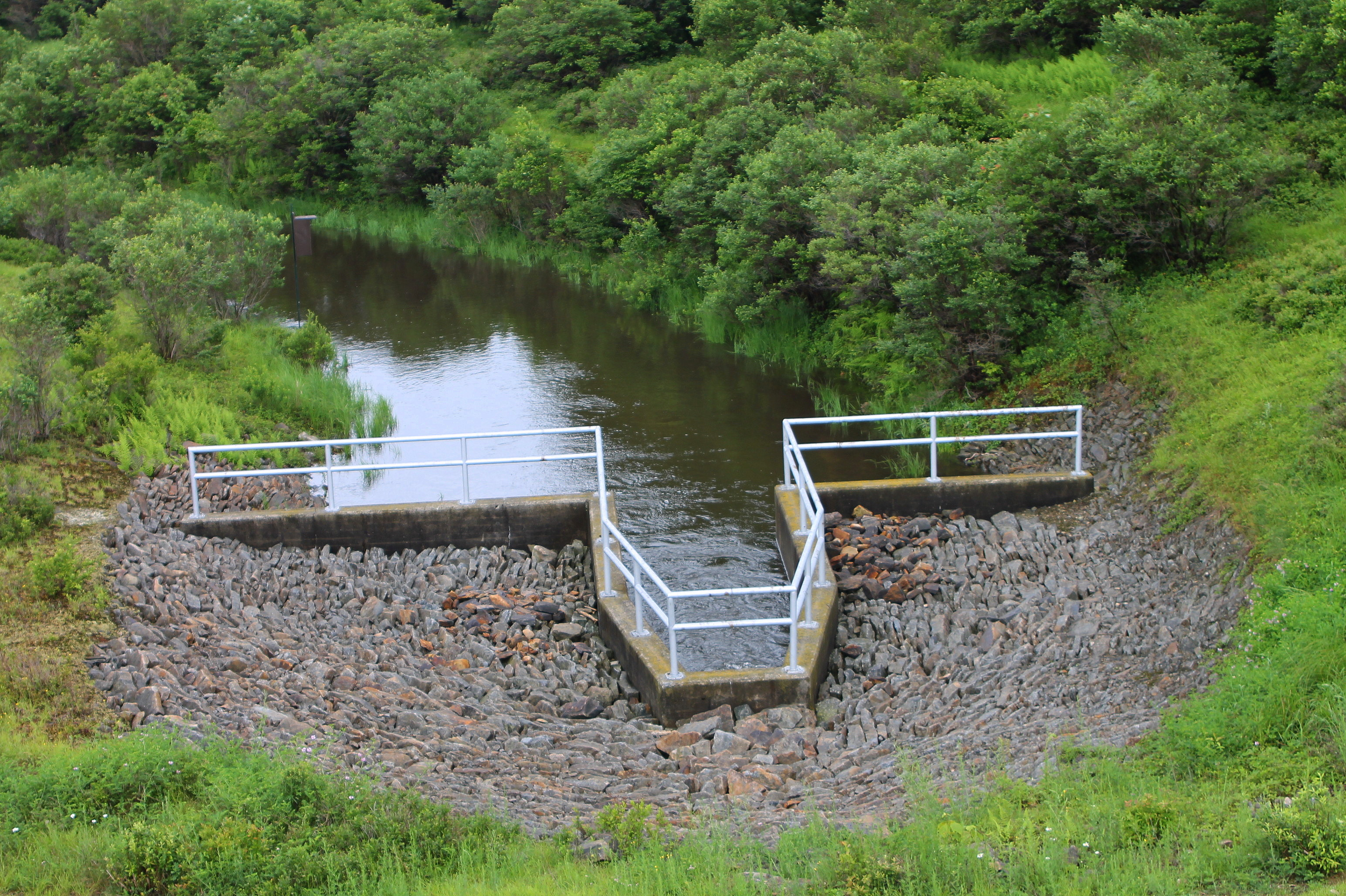
The outflow of Lake Jean

The main outflow of Lake Jean is an unnamed tributary of Kitchen Creek. Its inflows include unofficially named streams such as "Beaver Tributary" and "Ganoga Tributary", as well as direct drainage. Both the lake's main inflow and its main outflow are around 10 feet (3.0 m) wide and 1 to 2 feet (0.30 to 0.61 m) deep. The elevation of the lake is 2,218 feet (676 m) above sea level. The lake has a highly irregular shape. Its maximum length is 10,560 feet (3,220 m) and its maximum width is 1,980 feet (600 m).

The largest inflow to Lake Jean is the outlet of Ganoga Lake, which is 0.4 miles (0.64 km) northwest of Lake Jean. Drainage from a tract of wetland also flows into the lake. There are several coves and inlets on the lake, especially on its western side, where there are also some wetlands. The lake also has a few islands. The surrounding land rises to at most 90 feet (27 m) above the lake.

Lake Jean is relatively shallow, with an average depth of 5.9 feet (1.8 m). Some of the deepest parts of the lake are only 14 to 16 feet (4.3 to 4.9 m) deep, though it can reach up to 19.5 feet (5.9 m) in depth. The lake has an area of 245 acres (99 ha) and a volume of 486 million gallons.

Lake Jean is entirely within the United States Geological Survey quadrangle of Red Rock. The village of Red Rock is located 3 miles (4.8 km) to the south of the lake. The lake is located within Ricketts Glen State Park. It is in the northernmost part of the watershed of Fishing Creek.

The main rock formation in the watershed of Lake Jean is the Burgoon Sandstone, which contains interbedded gray shale, conglomerate, and mudstone. However, a small patch of the Mauch Chunk Formation occurs in the northern part of the watershed. The only soil in the watershed is the Wellsboro-Oquaga-Morris Association. However, the Lackawanna-Arnot-Morris Association occurs near the watershed's southwestern border.

Lake Jean is dammed by the earthen Lake Jean Dam, which is 26 feet (7.9 m) high and 780 feet (240 m) long. As of 1980, the dam and its eastern and western dikes can handle 73 percent of the probable maximum flood without overtopping. The lake is owned by the Pennsylvania Department of Conservation and Natural Resources.

Lake Jean has a beach with a length of 600 feet (180 m). It is open from late May to mid September.

== Hydrology ==
Lake Jean was historically rendered acidic by atmospheric deposition. In the summer of 1991, its pH was found to be 5.8, less than the minimum of 6.0 needed to attain its designated uses for aquatic life. The lake was listed as an impaired waterbody for this reason in 1996. By 2007, the pH had increased to 6.5 to 7.4, within Pennsylvania's criteria for pH. However, the lake is still impaired by mercury from atmospheric deposition.

The hydraulic retention time of water in Lake Jean is 0.6 years. The average discharge of the lake's outflow is 3.6 cubic feet per second. On August 6, 1974, the water temperature of the lake at a depth of 3 feet (0.91 m) was 20.5 °C (68.9 °F). The Secchi depth of the lake was measured to be 69.0 inches (175 cm) in the 1970s. The specific conductance at this time ranged from 32 to 33 micro-siemens per centimeter at 25 °C (77 °F).

The daily load of acidity at the outflow of Lake Jean is 194.0 pounds (88.0 kg). The total maximum daily load of acidity at this point is 34.2 pounds (15.5 kg). The lake's various inflows require an 87 to 97 percent reduction to meet their total maximum daily load requirements. In the 1970s, two measurements of water hardness in the lake were 5 and 8 milligrams per liter.

In the 1970s, two measurements of the concentration of hydrogen ions in Lake Jean ranged from 0.00020 to 0.00160 milligrams per liter. The dissolved oxygen concentration was 9.5 milligrams per liter and the carbon dioxide concentration ranged from 0.6 to 5.1 milligrams per liter. The concentration of organic carbon was 2.3 milligrams per liter. The concentration of bicarbonate was 2 milligrams per liter in two measurements. The nitrogen concentration was 0.33 milligrams per liter in one measurement and the concentration of organic nitrogen ranged from 0.13 to 0.37 milligrams per liter. The phosphorus concentration ranged from 0.010 to 0.020 milligrams per liter and the phosphate concentration was 0.031 milligrams per liter. The sulfate concentration ranged from 2.5 to 7.2 milligrams per liter. The fluoride concentration was twice measured to be 0.10 milligrams per liter and the chloride concentration ranged between 4.0 and 6.4 milligrams per liter. The concentration of silica ranged between 0 and 0.1 milligrams per liter.

In the 1970s, two measurements of the sodium concentration in filtered waters of Lake Jean ranged from 1.10 to 3.50 milligrams per liter. The potassium concentration was twice measured to be 0.60 milligrams per liter. The concentration of magnesium ranged between 0.40 and 0.60 milligrams per liter and the calcium concentration ranged between 1.00 and 2.40 milligrams per liter. Detectable amounts of nickel and cadmium were observed in the lake, but no chromium or copper was detected. The concentrations of both cobalt and lead were less than 2 micrograms per liter. The zinc concentration was once measured to be 20 micrograms per liter. The concentration of iron ranged from a detectable amount to 240 micrograms per liter and the manganese concentration ranged between a detectable amount and 70 milligrams per liter.

== Watershed ==
The watershed of Lake Jean has an area of 1,998 acres (809 ha) (including the lake itself) and is located in eastern Sullivan County and western Luzerne County. Discounting the lake, the watershed has an area of 1,745 acres (706 ha). Pennsylvania Route 487 passes through the lake's watershed in a north–south direction.

Discounting Lake Jean itself, a total of 1,414 acres (572 ha) (81.0 percent) of the watershed is forested land. 220 acres (89 ha) (12.6 percent) of the watershed contains fields and 82 acres (33 ha) (4.7 percent) consists of other lakes. The remaining 29 acres (12 ha) (1.7 percent) consists of wetlands.

== History and etymology ==
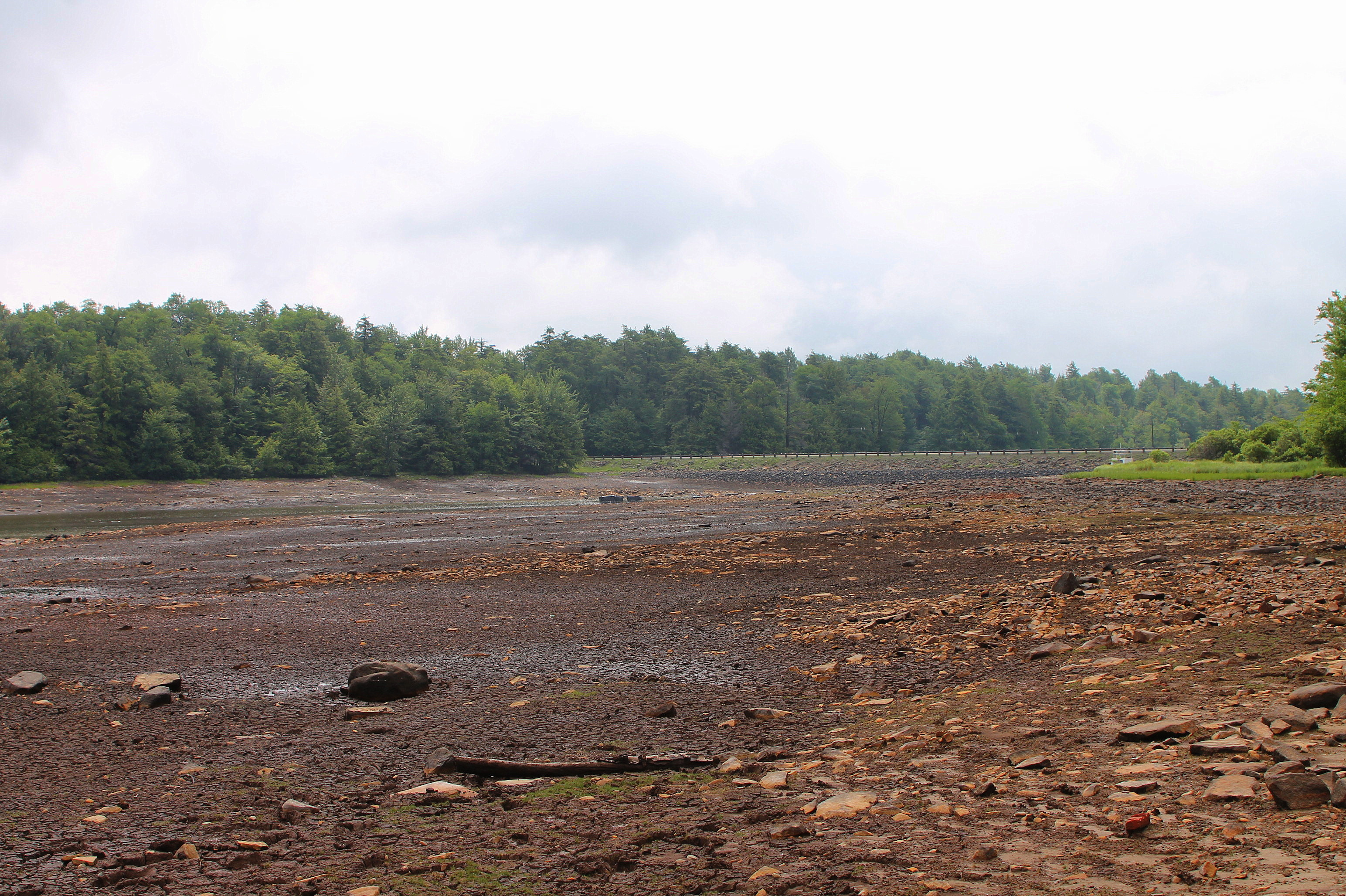
The partially drained Lake Jean

Lake Jean was entered into the Geographic Names Information System on August 2, 1979. Its identifier in the Geographic Names Information System is 1177996. The lake is named after the first daughter of Colonel R. Bruce Ricketts, a 19th-century/20th century landowner. Ricketts named the lake after Jean Holberton Ricketts in 1905. The lake was initially created for the purpose of moving large logs in R. Bruce Ricketts' logging industry. However, a natural lake was originally in that location. Boating and fishing were being done on the lake as early as the early 1900s.

In 1958, the Pennsylvania Fish Commission declared Lake Jean unsuitable for fishing, as its fish population was unbalanced. Fishing in the lake was forbidden until 1961, as attempts were made to chemically reclaim the lake. The Pennsylvania Department of Environmental Resources added 106 tons of cement stack dust to the lake's frozen surface in the winter of 1959 for this purpose.

In 1995, the Pennsylvania Department of Conservation and Natural Resources began adding lime to Lake Jean to combat its acidity. Lime was added semi-annually (in the spring and fall) for a number of years, with 19 tons per year typically being added.

The Lake Jean Dam was constructed in the 1950s by the old Department of Forests and Waters. The dam was earthen and replaced an older dam. This operation combined Mud Pond with what was then Lake Jean to create the 245 acres (99 ha) lake that currently exists. While it has been maintained, various parts have deteriorated. In June 2015, the lake will be entirely drained to repair the dam's control tower. It will take about two weeks to drain the lake, though a stream of water will still flow through its deepest parts. In 2015, the project was expected to cost $800,000. Lake Jean was reopened in May 2016.

== Biology ==
Lake Jean is listed on the Luzerne County Natural Areas Inventory.

Warmwater game fish and panfish inhabit Lake Jean. Specific fish in the lake include trout, smallmouth bass, largemouth bass, crappie, bluegill, and pickerel. Additionally, pumpkinseed and yellow perch have been observed within the lake. It is stocked with trout.

Historically, Lake Jean had a low level of fish biodiversity due to its acidity. In 1985, seven species were observed in the lake. However, in 1997, eleven species were observed, and in 2007, twelve species were observed. Canada geese are also sometimes observed at the lake. At least 30 individuals of an invertebrate species of concern have been observed on the lake's shoreline. Species such as Aeshna clepsydra and Carterocephalus palaemon mandan have been observed in its vicinity.

Lake Jean used to experience a bladderwort infestation. At its most severe point, Pennsylvania Department of Conservation and Natural Resources employees had to rake bladderwort off the lake's beaches on a daily basis. However, bladderwort populations have been reduced since the lake became less acidic, and the lake's plant biodiversity has increased. Most of the forests in the lake's watershed are deciduous forests. However, some areas of conifer forest are present, especially in the watershed's western part. Small waterwort and Sphinx gordius also inhabit the lake.

The shores of Lake Jean are lined with hardwood forests, hemlocks, pine trees, and sedges. As early as the early 1900s, virtually all of the forested land in the watershed was second-growth forest.

== Recreation ==
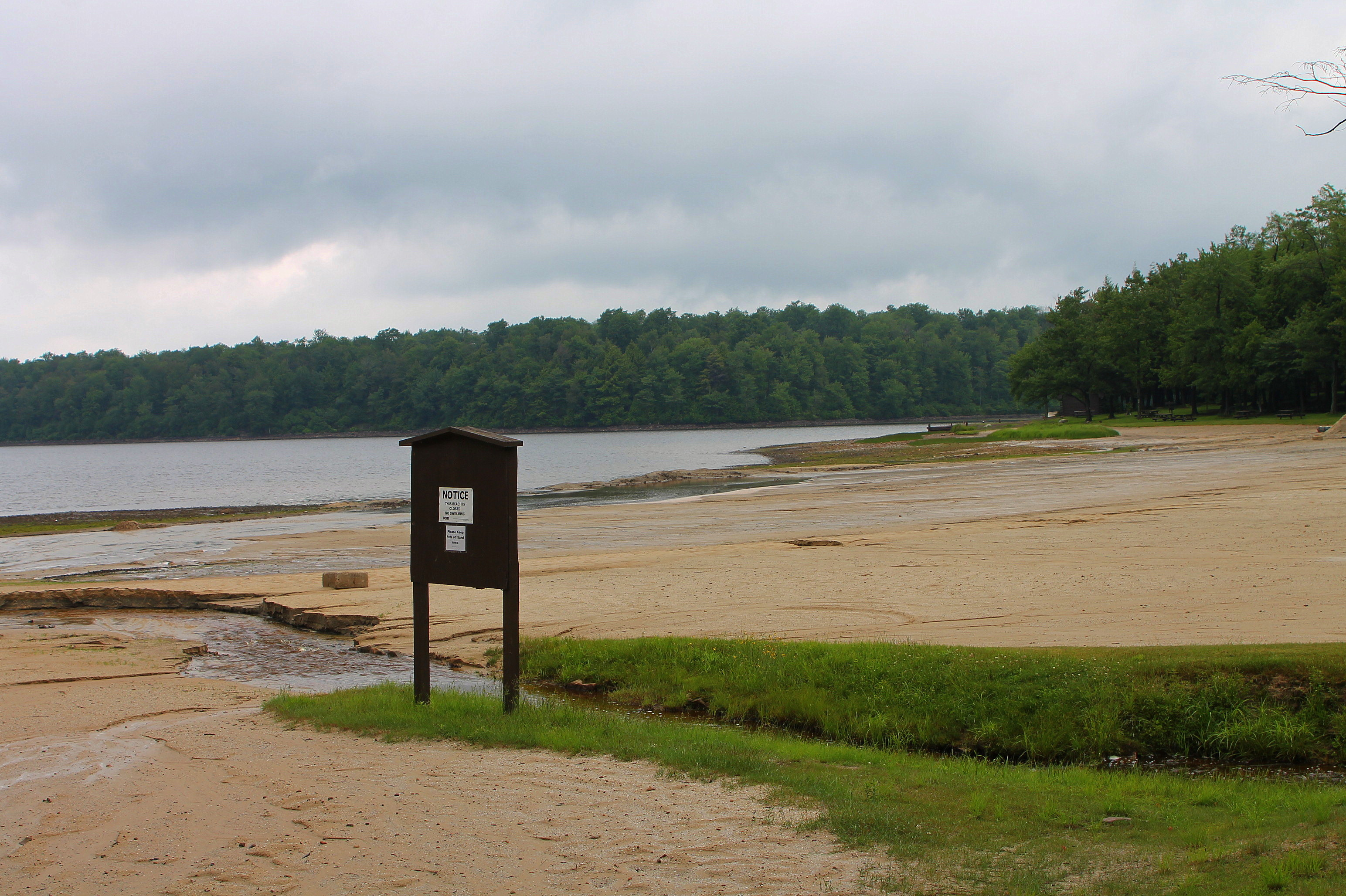
Beach at Lake Jean

Lake Jean is mainly used for recreation and fishing.

According to Times Leader, most of the 330,000 annual visitors to Ricketts Glen State Park visit Lake Jean. In 2014, the Pennsylvania Fish and Boat Commission temporarily lifted fishing restrictions in Lake Jean in preparation for the lake's draining. Ice fishing is permitted on the lake in the wintertime. There are also two boat launches on the lake. Both motorboats with electric motors and non-powered boats are permitted. There are picnic facilities along Lake Jean.

Jeff Mitchell's book Paddling Pennsylvania: Canoeing and Kayaking the Keystone State's Rivers and Lakes describes Lake Jean as being "known for its beauty" and "one of the finest lakes for paddling in Pennsylvania".

The 0.8-mile-long Beach Trail at Ricketts Glen State Park goes along Lake Jean. There are ten modern cabins near the lake.

== See also ==
- Ganoga Lake, a lake located further upstream
- Lake Rose, a lake located further downstream
- List of lakes in Pennsylvania
