= Ganoga Lake =

Natural lake Pennsylvania

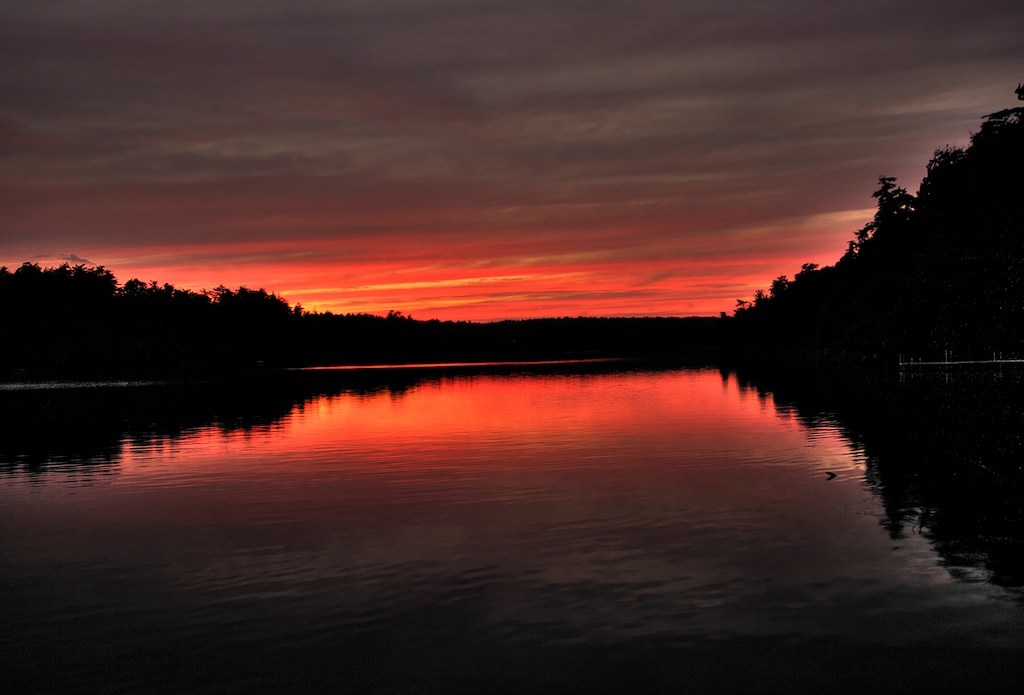
- Sunset on Ganoga Lake

- Location of Ganoga Lake in Pennsylvania
- Location: Colley Township, Sullivan County, Pennsylvania, US
- Coordinates: 41°21′22″N 76°19′06″W
- Type: Lake
- River sources: Kitchen Creek
- Catchment area: 1.5 sq mi (3.9 km^{2})
- Basin countries: United States
- Max. length: 0.88 mi (1.42 km)
- Surface area: 78.8 acres (31.9 ha)
- Average depth: 10 ft (3.0 m)
- Max. depth: 13 ft (4.0 m)
- Water volume: 373 acre⋅ft (460,000 m^{3})
- Surface elevation: 2,260 ft (690 m)

Ganoga Lake is a natural lake in Colley Township in southeastern Sullivan County in Pennsylvania, United States. Known as Robinson's Lake and Long Pond for most of the 19th century, the lake was purchased by the Ricketts family in the early 1850s and became part of R. Bruce Ricketts' extensive holdings in the area after the American Civil War. The lake is one of the highest in Pennsylvania, which led Ricketts to name it Highland Lake by 1874 and rename it Ganoga Lake in 1881; Pennsylvania senator Charles R. Buckalew suggested the name Ganoga from the Seneca language word for "water on the mountain".

The Ricketts built a stone house on the lake shore by 1852 or 1855; this served as a hunting lodge and tavern. In 1873 a large wooden addition was built north of the stone house, which became a hotel known as the North Mountain House. The hotel had one of the first summer schools in the United States in 1876 and 1877. A branch railroad line to the lake served the hotel and also hauled ice cut from the lake for refrigeration. The hotel closed in 1903, though the house remained the Ricketts family summer home. After the death of R. Bruce Ricketts in 1918, his heirs sold much of his 80,000 acres (32,000 ha) to the state for Pennsylvania State Game Lands and Ricketts Glen State Park. The state tried to purchase the lake in 1957, but was outbid by a group of investors who turned the land around it into a private housing development; as such it is "off limits" to the public.

Ganoga Lake is on the Allegheny Plateau, just north of the Allegheny Front, in sedimentary rocks from the Pocono Formation. The Wisconsin Glaciation some 20,000 years ago changed the drainage patterns of the lake; this diverted its waters to Kitchen Creek and carved the 24 named waterfalls in Ricketts Glen State Park in the process. Ganoga Lake has a continental climate, with average monthly high temperatures ranging from 33 °F (1 °C) in January to 82 °F (28 °C) in July. Ganoga Lake's drainage basin is heavily forested and it is in an Important Bird Area. The lake and its surroundings have a variety of flora and fauna, although the ecosystem has been damaged by acid rain.

== Description ==
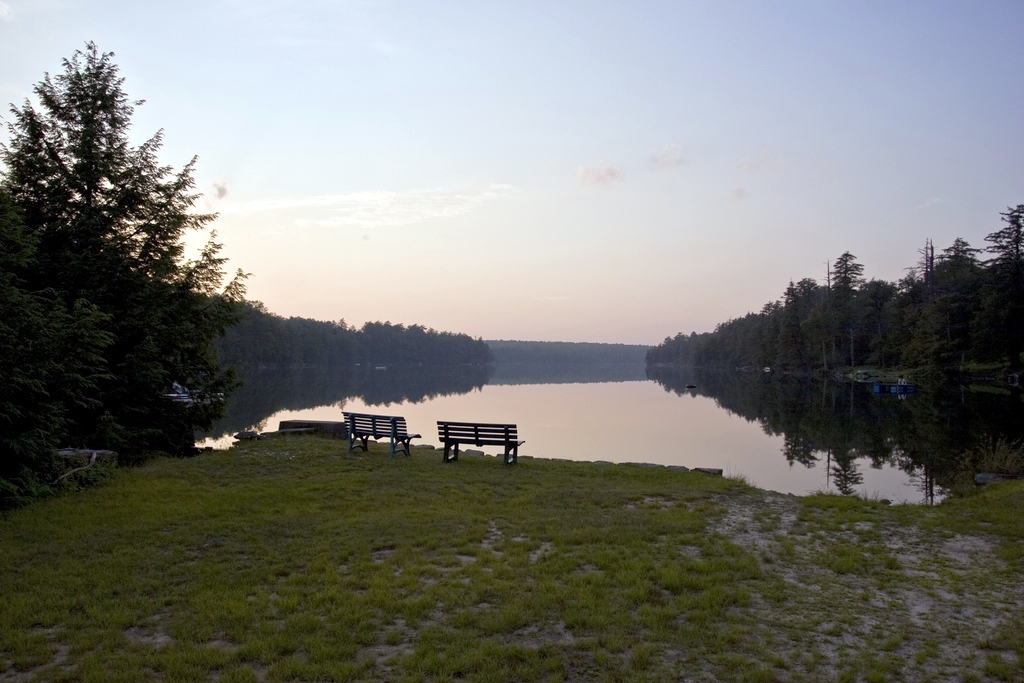
View from the southern end of the lake; the outlet for Kitchen Creek is at left

Ganoga Lake is a natural spring-fed lake just west of Pennsylvania Route 487 in southern Colley Township in southeastern Sullivan County, Pennsylvania. It is near the meeting point of Sullivan, Columbia and Luzerne counties, and is less than 0.4 miles (0.6 km) northwest of Ricketts Glen State Park. Ganoga Lake is on the Allegheny Plateau at an elevation of 2,260 feet (690 m). William Reynolds Ricketts, who owned the lake in the first half of the 20th century, claimed it was the highest lake in the United States east of the Rocky Mountains; Petrillo repeats this in his history of the region, Ghost Towns of North Mountain. While the United States Geological Survey Geographic Names Information System identifies Ganoga Lake as the second highest in Pennsylvania (after Siebert Lake in Somerset County, at 2,287 feet (697 m)), the Pennsylvania Audubon Society says Ganoga Lake is "the highest elevation natural lake in Pennsylvania".

Ganoga Lake has a long, narrow oval shape, oriented north-northwest to south-southeast. In 1936 William Reynolds Ricketts wrote that the lake has an average width of 700 to 800 feet (210 to 240 m) and is "about one mile long, lacking 600 to 700 ft" or about 0.88 miles (1.42 km) in length. However, according to a 1917 Pennsylvania Water Resources Inventory Report, in its largest dimensions it is 3,720 feet (1,130 m) long (0.705 miles or 1.135 kilometres) by 1,025 feet (312 m) wide. It has an average depth of 10 feet (3.0 m) and a maximum depth of 13 feet (4.0 m). The drainage basin for the lake is an area of 1.5 square miles (3.9 km^{2}), and its capacity is 373 acre-feet (460,000 m^{3}) (121,500,000 US gallons or 459,900,000 litres or 101,200,000 imperial gallons).

A branch of Kitchen Creek flows from the southern end of the lake; 0.4 miles (0.64 km) downstream it enters Lake Jean in Ricketts Glen State Park. From there the water flows through Ganoga Glen and its 10 named waterfalls, then joins the main stem of the creek at Waters Meet; below this it flows over five more named waterfalls. Kitchen Creek is a tributary of Huntington Creek, which flows into Fishing Creek, which is a tributary of the Susquehanna River.

== History ==
=== First inhabitants ===
Ganoga Lake is in the Susquehanna River drainage basin, the earliest recorded inhabitants of which were the Iroquoian-speaking Susquehannocks. Their numbers were greatly reduced by disease and warfare with the Five Nations of the Iroquois, and by 1675 they had died out, moved away, or been assimilated into other tribes. After this, the lands of the Susquehanna valley were under the nominal control of the Iroquois, who encouraged displaced tribes from the east to settle there, including the Shawnee and Lenape (or Delaware).

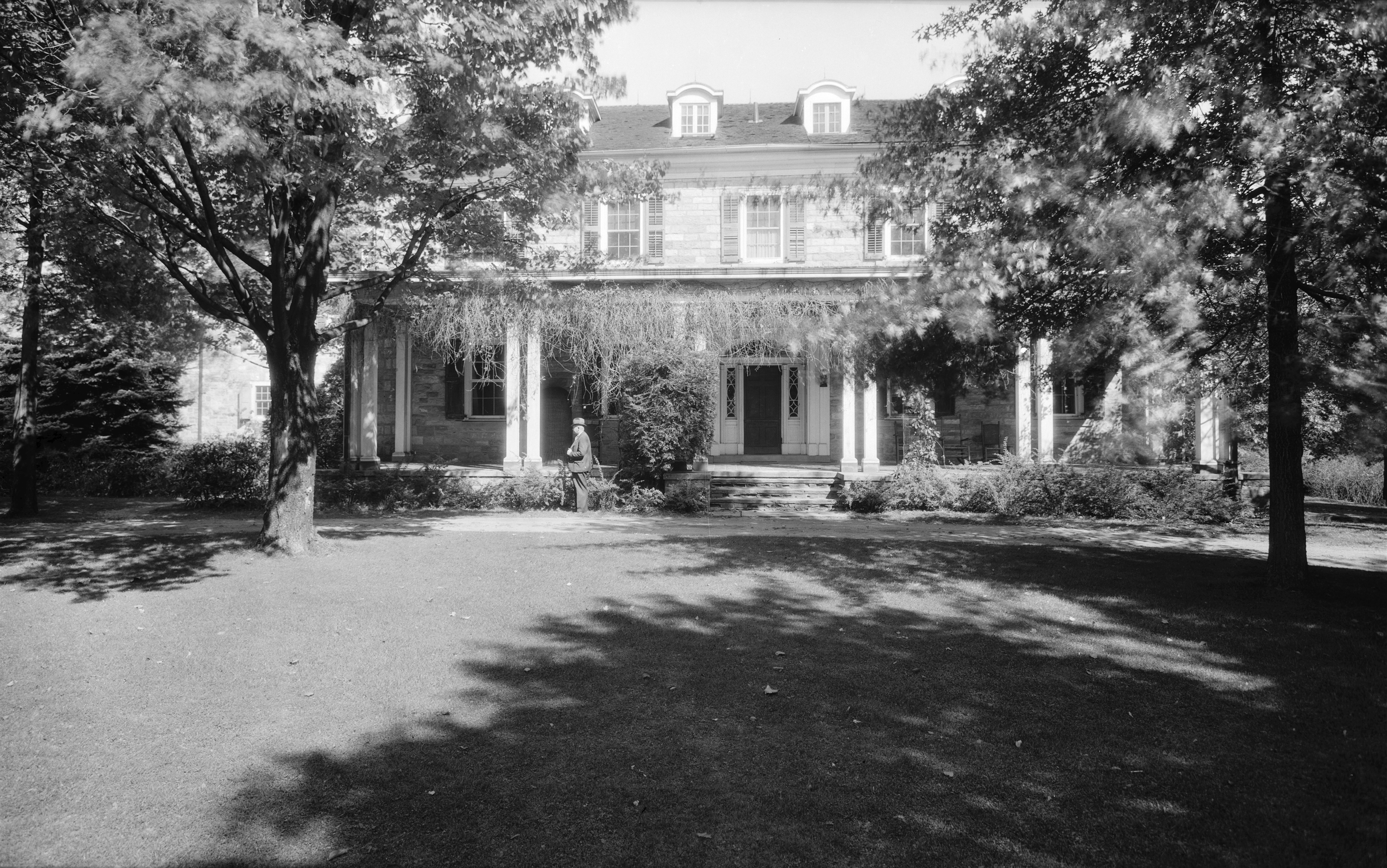
The front of the 1852 stone house, which became the Ricketts family mansion on the lake (photo taken in 1935)

On November 5, 1768, the British acquired land, known in Pennsylvania as the New Purchase, from the Iroquois in the Treaty of Fort Stanwix; this included what is now Ganoga Lake. After the American Revolutionary War (1775–1783), Native Americans almost entirely left Pennsylvania. The lake was originally in Northumberland County, then became part of Lycoming County when it was formed in 1795. Sullivan County was formed from Lycoming County in 1847, and two years later Colley Township was formed from Cherry Township. The lake drains into Kitchen Creek, where a Native American pot, decorated in the style of "the peoples of the Susquehanna region", was found under a rock ledge around 1890.

A hunter named Robinson, whose cabin was at the lake's northern end about 1800, was the first recorded inhabitant. He gave the lake its earliest known name: Robinson's Lake. However, for most of the 19th century the lake was known as Long Pond, because of its elongated shape. From 1822 to 1827 the Susquehanna and Tioga Turnpike, which followed the lake's western shore, was built between the Pennsylvania communities of Berwick in the south and Towanda in the north. Beginning in 1827 the northbound daily stagecoach left Berwick in the morning and stopped for lunch at the Long Pond Tavern on the lake about noon. The stage operated until 1851; the road was the Susquehanna and Tioga Turnpike until 1908, when the modern Pennsylvania Route 487 was built. Route 487 follows the course of the turnpike as it approaches the lake from the south, then passes to the east of the lake instead.

While on a hunting trip north of the lake in 1850, brothers Elijah and Clemuel Ricketts were frustrated at having to spend the night on a hotel's parlor floor. In 1851 or 1853 they bought 5,000 acres (2,000 ha), including the lake, as their own hunting preserve, and built a stone house on the lake shore by 1852 or 1855.^{[a]} The stone house served as their lodge and as a tavern; it was known as "Ricketts Folly" for its isolated location in the wilderness. Clemuel died in 1858 and Elijah bought his share of the land and house.

=== R. B. Ricketts ===
Elijah's son Robert Bruce Ricketts, for whom Ricketts Glen State Park is named, joined the Union Army as a private at the outbreak of the American Civil War in 1861, and rose through the ranks to become a colonel. After the war, R. B. Ricketts returned to Pennsylvania and purchased the stone house, lake, and some of the land around it from his father on September 25, 1869 for $3,969.81 (approximately $96,000 in 2025); eventually he controlled or owned more than 80,000 acres (32,000 hectares), including the lake and the park's glens and waterfalls.

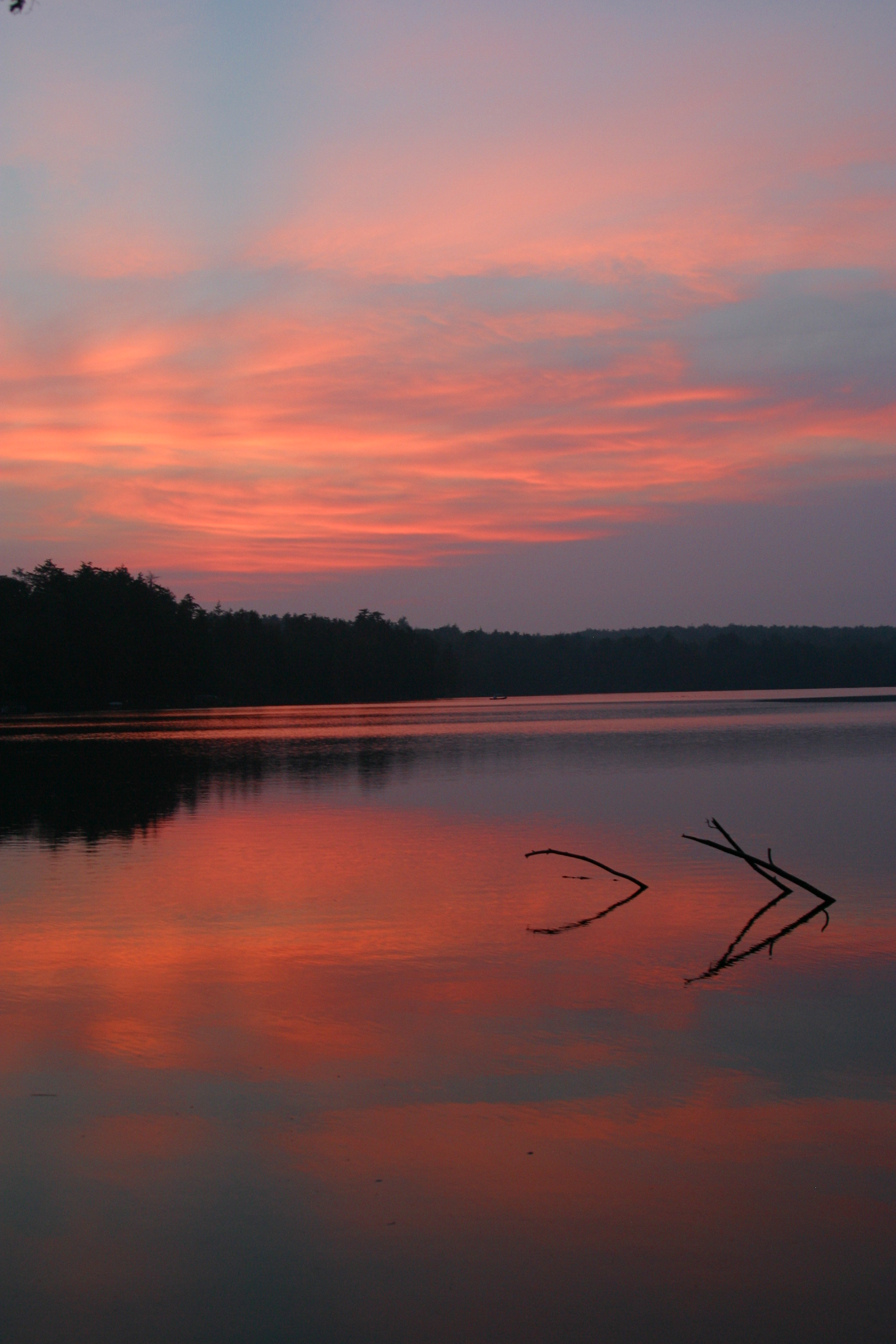
R. B. Ricketts "protected his 'pet'", Ganoga Lake, from clearcutting.

From 1872 to 1875 Ricketts and his partners operated a sawmill near the lake, 0.5 miles (0.8 km) southeast of his house. In 1872 Ricketts used lumber from the mill to build a three-story wooden addition next to the stone house; this opened as the North Mountain House hotel in 1873, and was run by Ricketts' brother Frank from then until 1898. The hotel hosted many of the Ricketts friends and relations as well as guests from Wilkes-Barre, Philadelphia, New York City, and other places. Many of the guests arrived after school let out in June and stayed all summer until school resumed in September. In 1876 and 1877, Ricketts ran the first summer school in the United States at his house and hotel; one of the teachers was Joseph Rothrock, later known as the "Father of Forestry" in Pennsylvania.

Ricketts and the others living in the area were not aware of the waterfalls in what is now the state park until about 1865, when they were discovered by two of the Ricketts' guests who went fishing and wandered down Kitchen Creek. In 1879 Ricketts started the North Mountain Fishing Club, for anglers on the lake and creek. Guests of the hotel paid one dollar to fish as a club member. By 1874 Ricketts had renamed Long Pond as Highland Lake, and by 1875 had named the highest waterfall on Kitchen Creek as Ganoga Falls. In 1881, Ricketts renamed Highland Lake as Ganoga Lake. Pennsylvania senator Charles R. Buckalew suggested the name Ganoga, an Iroquoian word which he said meant "water on the mountain" in the Seneca language. Donehoo's A History of the Indian Villages and Place Names in Pennsylvania identifies it as a Cayuga language word meaning "place of floating oil" and the name of a Cayuga village in New York. Ganoga Lake is the source of the branch of Kitchen Creek that flows through Ganoga Glen, which has the tallest waterfall.

Ricketts was a lumberman who made his fortune clearcutting nearly all his land, but no logging was allowed within 0.5-mile (0.8 km) of the lake, and the glens and their waterfalls in the state park were "saved from the lumberman's axe through the foresight of the Ricketts family". One hemlock tree cut near the lake to clear land for a building in 1893 was 6 feet (1.8 m) in diameter and 532 years old.

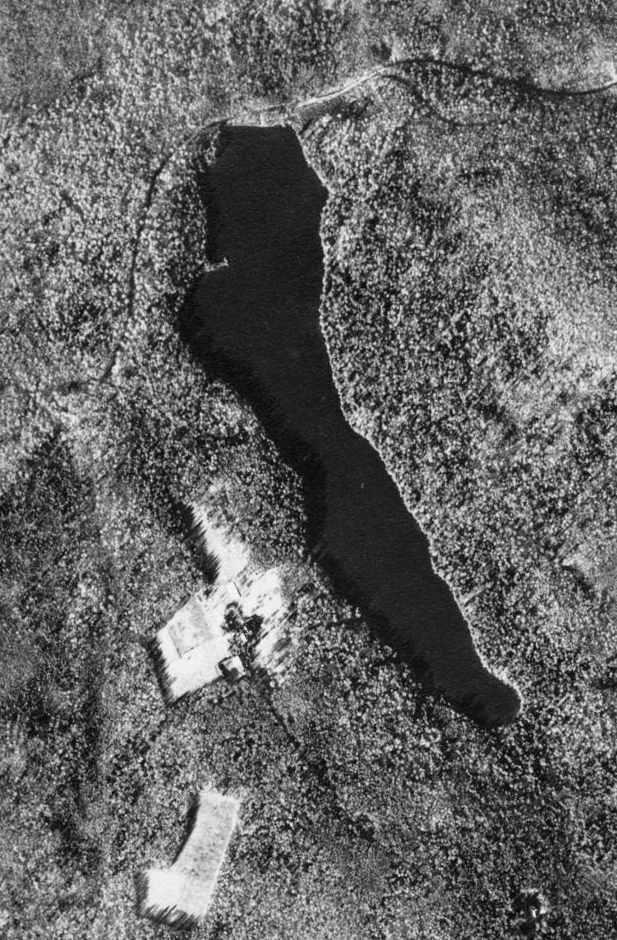
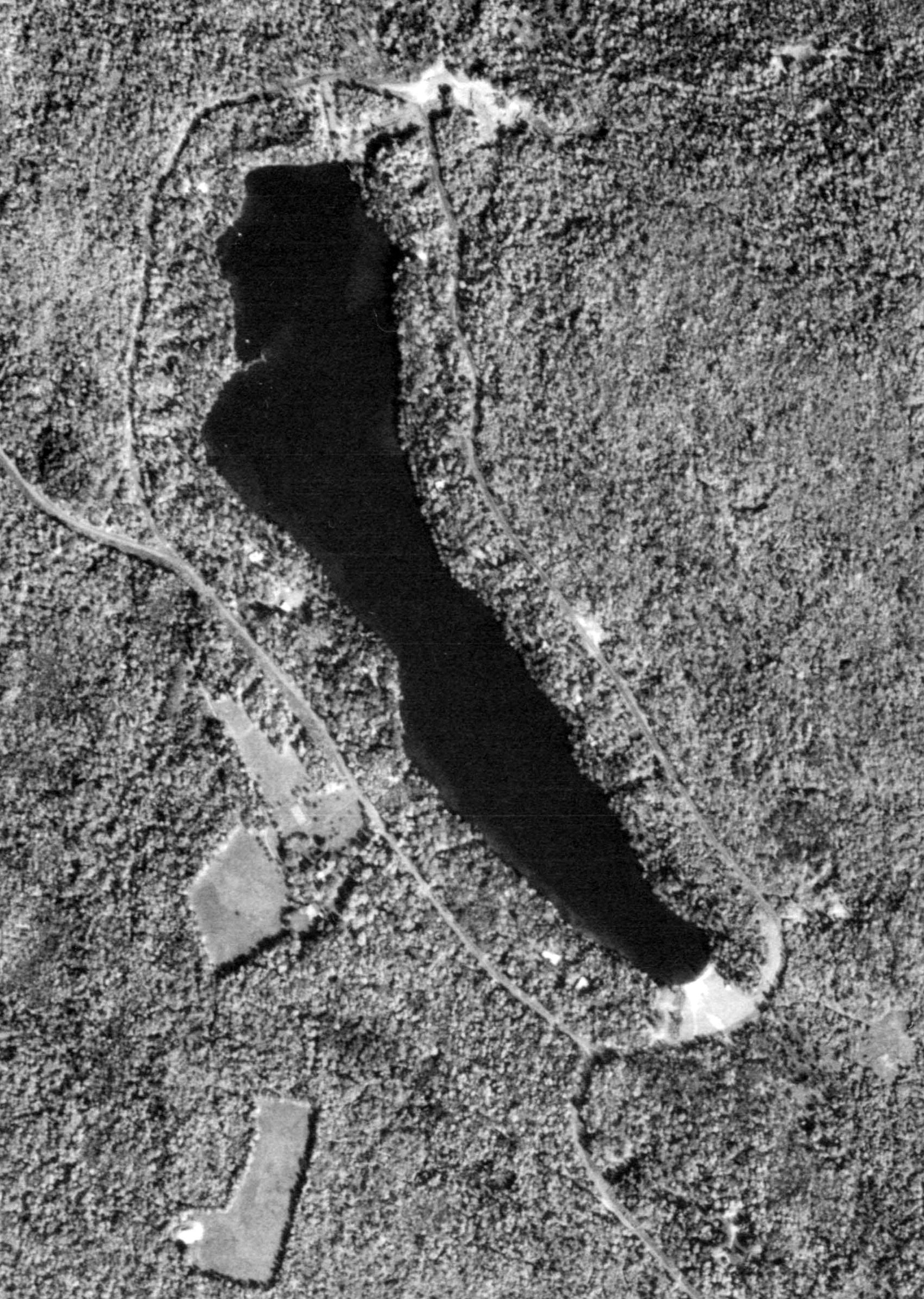
Aerial views of Ganoga Lake in 1938 (left) and 1969 (right). The mansion is in the cleared area at left. In 1938 the rail line is still visible at top, while in 1969 the new road circling the lake and new houses on its shores are visible.

Ricketts and his business partners built the lumber town of Ricketts about 4 miles (6 km) northeast of the lake starting in 1890; it had up to 800 inhabitants and several saw mills and operated until 1913, when the timber was exhausted. A 3.85-mile (6.20 km) branch line of the Lehigh Valley Railroad ran from Ricketts to the north end of the lake, opening in 1893. There was daily passenger service to Wilkes-Barre and Towanda on this line, which also served freight trains hauling ice from the lake for use in refrigeration from 1895 on. The ice cutting business on the lake employed 175 men, and had an 80-by-400-foot (24 by 122 m) ice house at the north end of the lake, near the small train station made of logs. The Ganoga Lake Ice Company was incorporated in 1897, and operated until about 1915. Ricketts' son William Reynolds Ricketts was one of five partners in the ice company. Ice skating was also a popular pastime on the lake. In 1913 the lake had a boathouse and was used by rowboats.

The North Mountain House was threatened by a forest fire in 1900; the subsequent loss of much of the surrounding old-growth forest led to decreased numbers of hotel guests. In 1903 another large fire on North Mountain threatened the sawmill in the village of Ricketts. The wooden addition to the stone house was torn down in either 1897 or 1903, and the land became a garden. The hotel closed in November 1903,^{[b]} and the fishing club and passenger train service ended with the closure.

The stone house remained the Ricketts family's summer home. After the hotel closed, several small cabins were built around the lake for rental to sportsmen. Ricketts proposed moving the highway from his front yard in 1904; the Pennsylvania General Assembly approved this in 1908, after he paid for the construction of the new highway. The house was renovated and added to in 1913, and Ricketts died there during the 1918 flu pandemic. His wife died shortly thereafter, and they are buried in the small Ricketts family cemetery near the north end of the lake.

=== Modern era ===
R. B. Ricketts and his wife had three children; their son William Reynolds Ricketts lived in the house after his parents' deaths. Between 1920 and 1924 the Pennsylvania Game Commission bought 48,000 acres (19,000 hectares) from the Ricketts heirs, via the Central Pennsylvania Lumber Company. This became most of Pennsylvania State Game Lands Number 13, west of the lake in Sullivan County. These sales left the Ricketts heirs with over 12,000 acres (4,900 hectares) surrounding Ganoga Lake and the glens with their waterfalls. The stone house was listed on the Historic American Buildings Survey in 1936, which gave its name as "Ganoga". The area was approved as a national park site in the 1930s, and the National Park Service operated a Civilian Conservation Corps camp at "Ricketts Glynn" (sic). Budget problems and World War II brought an end to national plans for development.

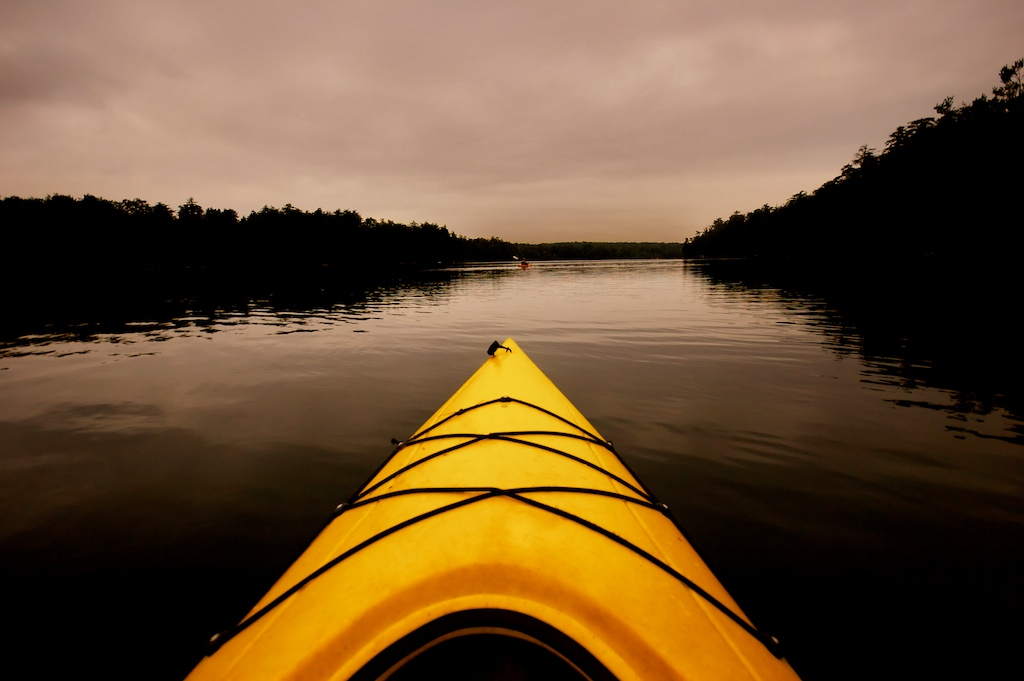
View of the lake from a kayak

In 1942 the Commonwealth of Pennsylvania bought 1,261 acres (510 hectares), including the glens and their waterfalls, from the heirs for $82,000. Ricketts Glen State Park opened in 1944. The state bought a total of 16,000 acres (6,500 hectares) more from the heirs in 1945 and 1950 for $68,000; the park today has about 10,000 acres (4,000 hectares) from the Ricketts family and about 3,000 acres (1,200 hectares) acquired from others. After World War II, William Reynolds Ricketts also sold the old-growth timber around Ganoga Lake to help pay property taxes.

William Reynolds Ricketts died in 1956 and the lake and surrounding land were sold in October 1957 for $109,000. The Department of Forests and Waters (predecessor of the Pennsylvania Department of Conservation and Natural Resources) bid on the 3,140 acres (1,270 ha) including the lake, but were outbid by a group of private investors. They initially planned to sell up to 788 building lots around the lake, but when sales were slower than expected, they instead "formed the Lake Ganoga Association in September 1959 to regulate and preserve the recreation and residential facilities at Lake Ganoga". Thus, private development of houses on the lake only began in the 20th century.

The association built 2.5 miles (4.0 km) of roads around the lake; the Air Force paved some of these to provide better access from the Benton Air Force Station in the park to a radio transmitter southwest of the lake. The Ganoga Lake Association also cleared some land at the lake's southern end, and its members built more than 50 houses on the lake shore. The stone house serves as the association's headquarters and clubhouse, and is used for association meetings, weddings, and picnics; in 1983 the house was listed on the National Register of Historic Places as the Clemuel Ricketts Mansion. Today the lake is used by kayakers and wind surfers. As a private development, "To all outsiders that have no property around the lake, the lake and grounds are off limits."

== Geology and climate ==
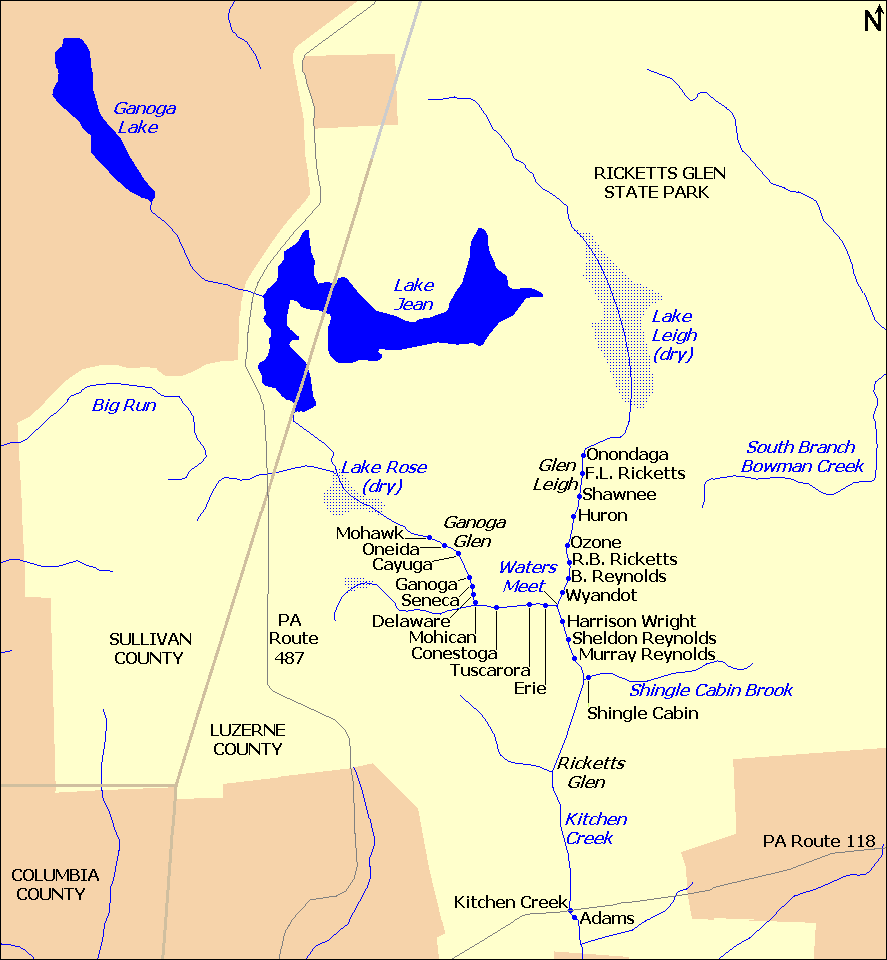
Map of Ganoga Lake and the upper part of Kitchen Creek and Ricketts Glen State Park

The rocks underlying Ganoga Lake are from the Mississippian Pocono Formation, which is a "light-gray to buff or light-olive-gray, medium-grained, crossbedded sandstone", with some siltstone and conglomerates. The Pocono Formation formed more than 340 million years ago, when the land was part of the coastline of a shallow sea that covered a great portion of what is now North America. The high mountains to the east of the sea gradually eroded, causing a build-up of sediment made up primarily of clay, sand and gravel. Tremendous pressure on the sediment caused the formation of the rocks that are found at the lake and in the drainage basin for Kitchen Creek: sandstone, shale, siltstone, and conglomerates. In 1894 R. Bruce Ricketts planned to mine yellow ocher near the lake.

Ganoga Lake is on the Allegheny Plateau, just north of the Allegheny Front, which is the boundary between the dissected plateau to the north and the Ridge-and-Valley Appalachians to the south. Kitchen Creek, which drains the lake, drops approximately 1,000 feet (300 m) in 2.25 miles (3.62 km) as it flows down the steep escarpment of the Allegheny Front. About 300 to 250 million years ago, the Allegheny Plateau, Allegheny Front, and Appalachian Mountains all formed in the Alleghenian orogeny. This happened long after the sedimentary rocks at the lake were deposited, when the part of Gondwana that became Africa collided with what became North America, forming Pangaea. In the years since, up to 5,000 feet (1,500 m) of rock has been eroded away by streams and weather. At least three major glaciations in the past million years have been the final factor in shaping the land around the lake today.

Prior to the last ice age, Ganoga Lake drained into Big Run, a tributary of Fishing Creek. This changed when the glaciers retreated to the northeast about 20,000 years ago, and formed glacial lakes. The retreating glaciers also left deposits of debris 20 to 30 feet (6.1 to 9.1 m) thick, which formed a dam blocking water from draining into Big Run. Instead, water from Ganoga Lake and the area that later became Lake Jean was diverted into the Ganoga Glen branch of Kitchen Creek. These diversions added about 7 square miles (18 km^{2}) to the Kitchen Creek drainage basin, increasing it by just over 50 percent to 20.1 square miles (52 km^{2}). The result was increased water flow in Kitchen Creek, which has been cutting the falls in the glens since. Glacial striations are found on the eastern side of the lake. The lake is in a shallow valley, 13 feet (4.0 m) deep, which is impounded by glacial till up to 30 feet (9.1 m) thick at the southeast end, where Kitchen Creek exits.

The Allegheny Plateau has a continental climate, with occasional severe low temperatures in winter and average daily temperature ranges (the difference between the daily high and low) of 20 °F (11 °C) in winter and 26 °F (14 °C) in summer. Ganoga Lake is part of the Huntington Creek watershed, where the mean annual precipitation is 40 to 48 inches (1,016 to 1,219 mm). Weather records are not available for Ganoga Lake, but they are known for the adjoining Ricketts Glen State Park. The highest recorded temperature at the park was 103 °F (39 °C) in 1988, and the record low was −17 °F (−27 °C) in 1984. On average, January is the coldest month, July is the hottest month, and June is the wettest month.

Climate data for Ricketts Glen State Park (next to Ganoga Lake)
Month	Jan	Feb	Mar	Apr	May	Jun	Jul	Aug	Sep	Oct	Nov	Dec	Year
Mean daily maximum °F (°C)	33 (1)	36 (2)	46 (8)	59 (15)	70 (21)	78 (26)	82 (28)	80 (27)	73 (23)	62 (17)	49 (9)	37 (3)	59 (15)
Mean daily minimum °F (°C)	15 (−9)	17 (−8)	25 (−4)	35 (2)	44 (7)	53 (12)	58 (14)	56 (13)	49 (9)	38 (3)	30 (−1)	21 (−6)	37 (3)
Average precipitation inches (mm)	2.76 (70)	2.52 (64)	3.13 (80)	3.45 (88)	3.80 (97)	4.99 (127)	4.07 (103)	3.30 (84)	4.49 (114)	3.21 (82)	3.38 (86)	3.01 (76)	42.11 (1,071)
Source: The Weather Channel

== Ecology ==
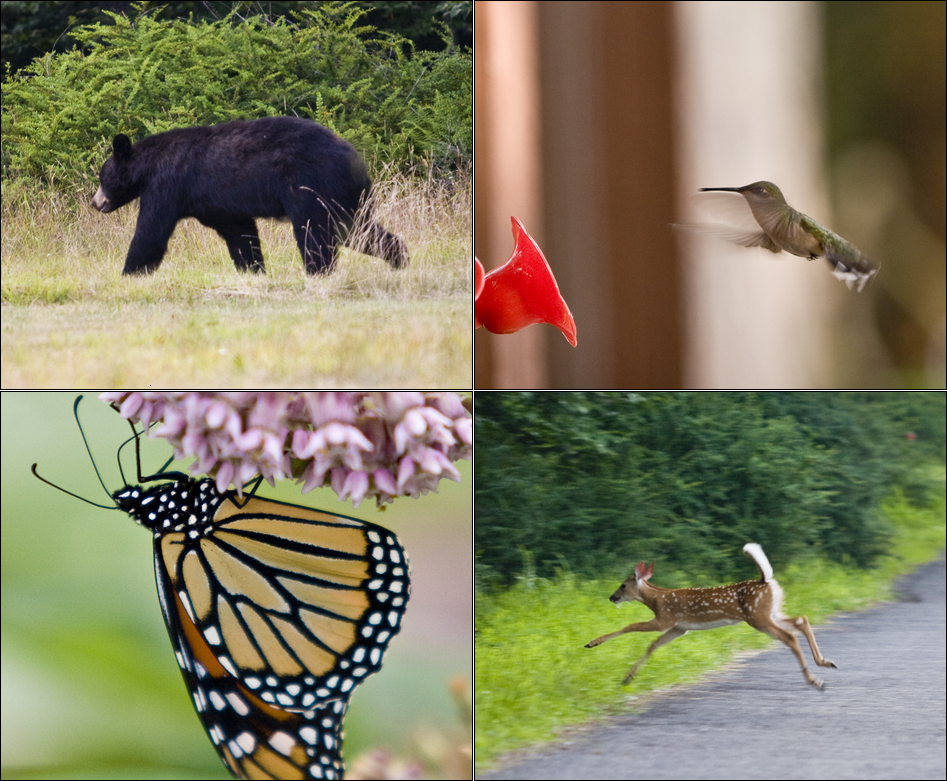
Animals photographed at the lake (clockwise from top left): black bear, hummingbird, white-tailed deer, and monarch butterfly

Ganoga Lake is the largest tributary of Lake Jean, via a 0.4-mile (0.6 km) branch of Kitchen Creek. While Lake Jean lies entirely within Ricketts Glen State Park, much of its 1,998-acre (809 ha) drainage basin extends beyond the park, and Ganoga Lake's 960-acre (390 ha) watershed accounts for nearly half of the total area. Lake Jean covers 253 acres (102 ha); the remaining 1,745 acres (706 ha) of the Lake Jean watershed are 81.0% hardwood forest, 12.6% pastures, 4.7% other lakes (including Ganoga Lake's 78.8 acres (31.9 ha)), and 1.7% wetlands. The park has more than 80 species of vines, shrubs, and trees; black gum, black spruce, eastern hemlock, eastern white pine, eastern larch, red maple, and yellow birch are found in area forests.

In the 19th century Ganoga Lake was home to trout, bullhead catfish, pike, pickerel, and black bass. The lake had very few plants in it, but its shore was lined with mountain laurel and, in the east, mountain ash. After the Ganoga Lake Association's 1957 purchase, they drained the lake to kill its fish, then stocked it with "30,000 fingerling brook trout". In 2007 Lake Jean, which is connected to Lake Ganoga via Kitchen Creek, was still home to many of the fish found there in the 19th century: brook trout, brown trout, brown bullhead, yellow bullhead, chain pickerel, and largemouth bass.

Although there are no pollution point sources in the drainage basin, acid rain is a major concern. Acidification has altered the ecology of the lakes and region; in Lake Jean low pH has decreased the number and quality of insects and plankton at the base of the food chain. Fish which are acid tolerant are predominant, including fathead minnow, muskellunge, pumpkinseed, walleye, and yellow perch. There are relatively few predators like chain pickerel and largemouth bass, and adult fish "appear to have good growth rates but poor reproductive success".

Despite the increased acidity, all of the Kitchen Creek drainage basin, which includes Ganoga Lake, is classified by the state of Pennsylvania as a "High Quality-Cold Water Fishery". Under the Clean Water Act a Total Maximum Daily Load (TMDL) has been established for acidic pollution in the Lake Jean watershed. Ganoga Lake's TMDL for acidity is 4.1 pounds (1.9 kg) per day. Long term exposure to acid rain also damages soil, depleting calcium levels, which may in turn affect insect populations and reproduction in birds. Lake Jean is also "impaired for mercury due to atmospheric deposition", although TMDLs have not yet been established for this.

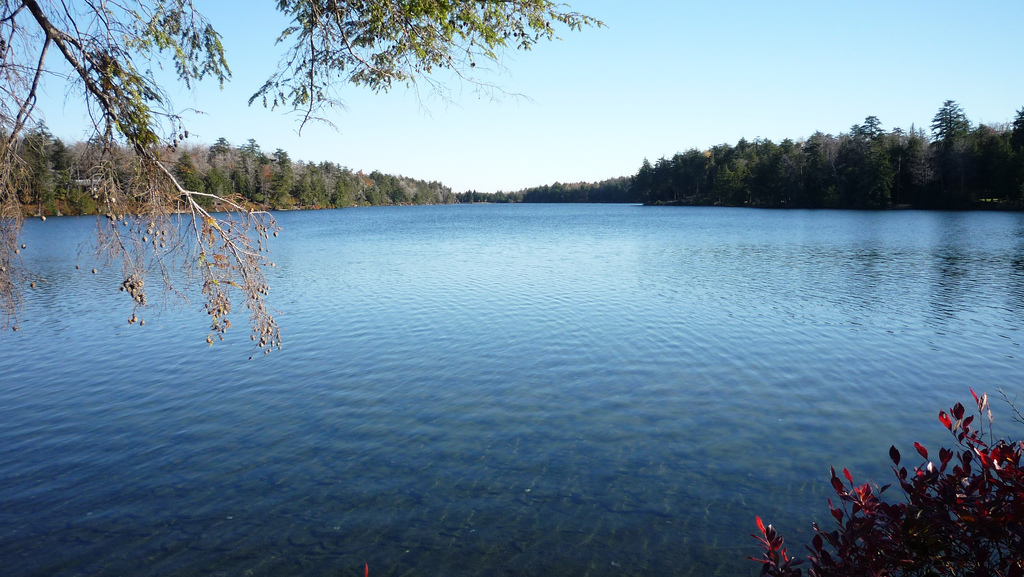
Today the lake is still surrounded by forest.

Ganoga Lake and Ricketts Glen State Park are part of the much larger 114,978-acre (46,530 ha) Pennsylvania Important Bird Area (IBA) #48, which the Audubon Society describes as "the largest extant forest in northeastern Pennsylvania and one of the largest in the Commonwealth". Over 75 species of bird are known to breed in the state park adjoining the lake. Lake Jean is home to bald eagle and Canada goose; aquatic birds found in the IBA include American bittern, American black duck, great blue heron, green-winged teal, hooded merganser, mallard duck, osprey, Virginia rail, and wood duck. Historically, common pheasant were found in the woods around the lake.

Ganoga Lake is on the Allegheny Plateau just north of the Allegheny Front; this region is known locally as North Mountain. Many bird species are found in the forests on North Mountain, including the state's only population of blackpoll warbler; other birds seen there include evening grosbeak, northern goshawk, red crossbill, and Swainson's thrush. Historically North Mountain was home to olive-sided flycatcher, and "was one of the few places one could enjoy the songs of all of Pennsylvania's native thrushes"; today it is home to the state's largest yellow-bellied flycatcher population.

Ganoga Lake and its surroundings have a variety of insects and animals. Butterflies in the region are studied by lepidopterists, and the hemlock woolly adelgid threatens many of the hemlock trees. Animals found on North Mountain and in the park include squirrel, black bear, fisher, hoary bat, otter, porcupine, raccoon, and white-tailed deer. In 1912, white-tailed deer around the lake became locally extinct due to loss of habitat from lumbering and overhunting. Pennsylvania imported nearly 1,200 white-tailed deer from Michigan between 1906 and 1925 to re-establish the species, and made it the official state animal in 1959. By 2001, deer populations had increased to the point where it was feared that "Pennsylvania is losing its vegetative diversity from deer over-browsing".

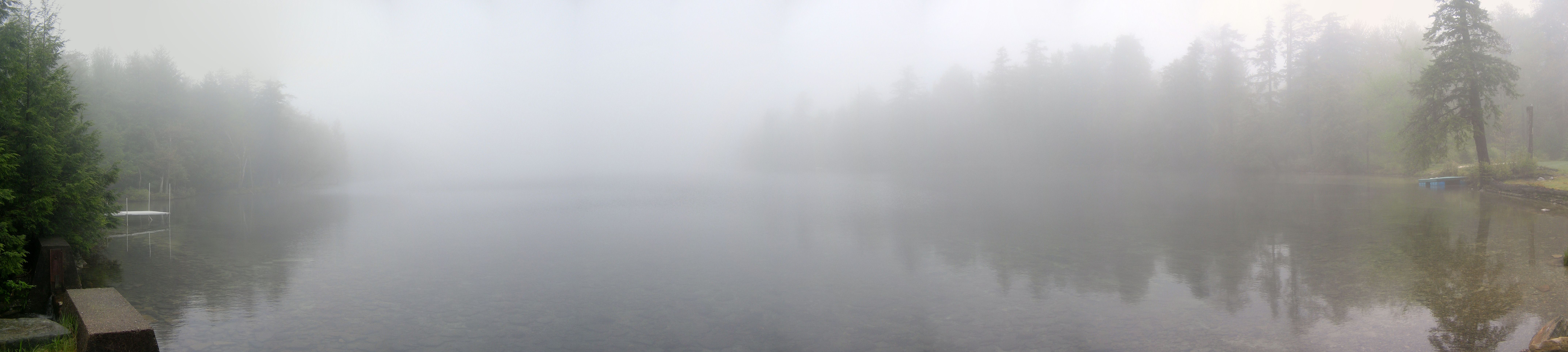
Panoramic view from the south end of the lake in the fog; the outlet to Kitchen Creek is in the lower left corner.

== Notes ==
a. According to William Reynolds Ricketts' history of the stone house for the Historic American Buildings Survey, Petrillo's history of the region Ghost Towns of North Mountain, and the National Register of Historic Places (NRHP) nomination form for the stone house, brothers Clemuel and Elijah Ricketts bought the lake and surrounding land in 1851, began building the stone house that year, and finished it in 1852. The year 1852 is also carved in stone on the front of the house. However, according to Tomasak's The Life and Times of Robert Bruce Ricketts, the brothers purchased the lake on April 13, 1853, and built the house from 1854 to 1855.
b. All sources agree that the North Mountain House hotel closed in 1903, but differ on the date that the wooden addition used for the hotel was torn down. William Reynold's Ricketts' history for the HABS and Petrillo's book both report it was razed in 1897, while the NRHP nomination form and Tomasak's book give the year as 1903.

== See also ==
- Lake Jean, a lake slightly further downstream
- List of lakes in Pennsylvania

== Works cited ==
- Bachelder, John B. (1875). Popular resorts, and how to reach them. Combining a Brief Description of the Principal Summer Retreats in the United States, and the Routes of travel Leading to Them. Boston, Massachusetts: J.B. Bachelder Publishing. OCLC 317328980. "ganoga."
- Braun, Duane D. (2007). "Surficial geology of the Red Rock 7.5-minute quadrangle, Luzerne, Sullivan, and Columbia Counties, Pennsylvania" (PDF). Pennsylvania Geological Survey, 4th series, Open-File Report OFSM 07-10.0. Pennsylvania Department of Conservation and Natural Resources. Archived from the original (PDF) on June 9, 2011.
- Braun, Duane D.; Inners, Jon D. "Pennsylvania Trail of Geology, Ricketts Glen State Park, Luzerne, Sullivan and Columbia Counties, The Rocks, the Glens and the Falls (Park Guide 13)" (PDF). Pennsylvania Department of Conservation and Natural Resources. Archived from the original (PDF) on April 20, 2004.
- Donehoo, George P. (1999) [1928]. A History of the Indian Villages and Place Names in Pennsylvania (PDF) (Second Reprint ed.). Lewisburg, Pennsylvania: Wennawoods Publishing. ISBN 1-889037-11-7. Archived from the original (PDF) on July 11, 2012. ISBN refers to a 1999 reprint edition, URL is for the Susquehanna River Basin Commission's web page of Native American Place names, quoting and citing the book
- Gross, Doug (May 2004). "Pennsylvania Important Bird Area #48 (Formerly #48 & 49) North Mountain including Ricketts Glen State Park and Dutch Mountain Wetlands, SGL 57, and SGL 13 (in part): Phase I Conservation Plan" (PDF). Pennsylvania Audubon Society. Archived from the original (PDF) on July 25, 2011.
  - See also: "Site Profile: Ricketts Glen – Crevelling Lake Area". National Audubon Society. 2012. Archived from the original on April 4, 2011.
- Pennsylvania Water Supply Commission (1917). Water Resources Inventory Report: Part III: Gazetteer of Streams: Act of July 25, 1913, Volumes 3–5. Harrisburg, Pennsylvania: Wm. Stanley Ray, State Publisher.
- Petrillo, F. Charles (1991). Ghost Towns of North Mountain: Ricketts, Mountain Springs, Stull (PDF). Wyoming Historical & Geological Society. OCLC 25080093.
- Richter, Daniel K. (2002). "Chapter 1. The First Pennsylvanians". In Miller, Randall M.; Pencak, William A. (eds.). Pennsylvania: A History of the Commonwealth. University Park, Pennsylvania: The Pennsylvania State University and the Pennsylvania Historical and Museum Commission. ISBN 0-271-02213-2.
- Ricketts, William Reynolds (1936). "William R. Ricketts House, North Mountain Colley, Ganoga Lake, Sullivan County, PA". Historic American Buildings Survey/Historic American Engineering Record. Library of Congress.
- Shultz, Charles H., ed. (1999). The Geology of Pennsylvania. Harrisburg and Pittsburgh, Pennsylvania: Pennsylvania Geological Society and Pittsburgh Geological Society. ISBN 0-8182-0227-0.
- Taber III, Thomas T. (1970). "Chapter 3.3 Ricketts – Trexler and Turrell Lumber Company". Ghost Lumber Towns of Central Pennsylvania: Laquin, Masten, Ricketts, Grays Run. Williamsport, Pennsylvania: Lycoming Print Co. OCLC 1044759.
- Tomasak, Peter (2008). In Command of Time Elapsed: The Life and Times of Robert Bruce Ricketts. Kyttle, Pennsylvania: North Mountain Publishing Company.
- Van Diver, Bradford B. (1990). Roadside Geology of Pennsylvania. Missoula, Montana: Mountain Press Publishing Company. ISBN 0-87842-227-7.
- Wallace, Paul A.W.; revised by William A. Hunter (2005). Indians in Pennsylvania (Second ed.). Harrisburg, Pennsylvania: Pennsylvania Historical and Museum Commission. ISBN 9781422314937. OCLC 1744740. (Note: OCLC refers to the 1961 First Edition).
- Wren, Christopher; Wyoming Historical and Geological Society (1914). A Study of North Appalachian Indian Pottery. Wilkes-Barre, Pennsylvania: E.B. Yordy Co. p. 56. OCLC 2510750. "murray reynolds indian pot."
