= Mossville, Pennsylvania =

Unincorporated community in Pennsylvania, US

- Unincorporated community
- Location within Pennsylvania Location within the United States
- Coordinates: 41°16′19″N 76°16′45″W
- Country: United States
- State: Pennsylvania
- County: Luzerne
- Township: Fairmount
- Elevation: 1,270 ft (390 m)
- Time zone: UTC-5 (Eastern (EST))
  - Summer (DST): UTC-4 (EDT)
- Area code: 570
- GNIS feature ID: 1204215

Mossville is an unincorporated community in Fairmount Township, Luzerne County, Pennsylvania, United States.
