= Lake Rose (Pennsylvania) =

Lake in Luzerne County, Pennsylvania, United States

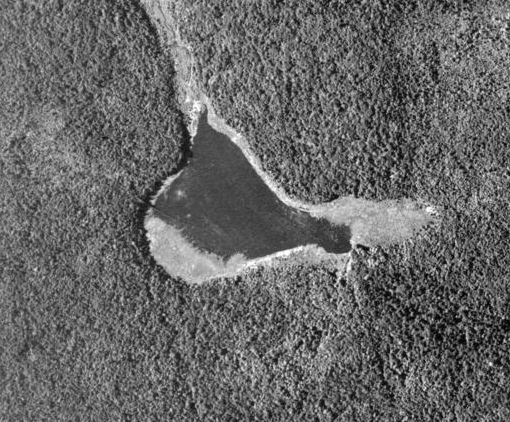
- Lake Rose as seen from the air in 1939

- Location within Pennsylvania Location within the United States
- Location: Fairmount Township, Luzerne County, Pennsylvania
- Coordinates: 41°19′44″N 76°17′42″W
- Primary inflows: spillway of Lake Jean
- Primary outflows: unnamed tributary to Kitchen Creek
- Basin countries: United States
- Built: before 1905
- Surface area: 25 acres (10 ha)
- Average depth: mostly dry
- Surface elevation: 2,192 feet (668 m)

Lake Rose is a dry lake in Luzerne County, Pennsylvania, in the United States. It has a surface area of approximately 25 acres (10 ha), and is situated in Fairmount Township. Lake Rose is mostly dry and closely resembles a swamp. Its main inflow is the spillway from Lake Jean. Lake Rose was originally constructed by a squatter named Jesse Dodson. Wildlife, including birds, butterflies, and dragonflies, has been observed near the lake. A number of hiking trails are also in its vicinity.

== Geography ==
The main outflow of Lake Rose is an unnamed tributary of Kitchen Creek. One of its main inflows is the spillway from Lake Jean. The lake has an elevation of 2,192 feet (668 m) above sea level. Lake Rose is entirely within the United States Geological Survey quadrangle of Red Rock. It has an area of 25 acres (10 ha).

Lake Rose is mostly dry, but there is a small pool of water in it. It more closely resembles a swamp than it does a lake. In 1990, Northeastern Geology stated that Lake Rose "appears on the map but not in reality".

Lake Rose was undeveloped in the early 1960s.

== History and recreation ==
Lake Rose was entered into the Geographic Names Information System on August 2, 1979. Its identifier in the Geographic Names Information System is 1185462.

Lake Rose was built by Jesse Dodson, a squatter who made bedsteads out of cherry trees, and built the lake as a log splash pond. In 1905, Colonel R. Bruce Ricketts reinforced the Lake Rose dam. However, due to the dam's poor construction, the lake could not be used for hydroelectric power. In the middle of the 20th century, the state of Pennsylvania condemned the dam and drained the lake.

In 1950, some studies were being done by the Division of Dams on dams or dam repairs at Lake Rose.

The Ganoga Glen Trail in Ricketts Glen State Park passes near Lake Rose, as does the Highland Trail.

== Biology ==
A Menziesia pilosa shrub was once observed in the vicinity of Lake Rose. Highbrush blueberry also occurs in the vicinity of the lake.

Certain types of wildlife can occur in the vicinity of Lake Rose, depending on the time of year. Birds in this area include white-throated sparrows, mallard ducks, and evening grosbeaks. Insect species include monarch butterflies, sulfur butterflies, and various species of dragonfly. The lake was stocked with fish as late as 1980.

== See also ==
- List of lakes in Pennsylvania
