= Red Rock Job Corps Center =

Job Corps training center in Sullivan County, Pennsylvania

Coordinates: 41.3583333°N 76.2950000°W

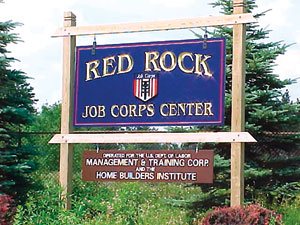
Red Rock Job Corps Center entrance sign

Red Rock Job Corps Center is a Job Corps training center in Colley Township, Sullivan County, Pennsylvania, USA. Like all Job Corps centers, it provides vocational training and education at no cost to participants, who are 16 to 24 years old. The center opened in 1978 and uses the buildings of the former Benton Air Force Station, a Cold War radar facility which operated from 1951 to 1975. Red Rock is on Pennsylvania Route 487 (PA 487) within Ricketts Glen State Park, and is still the site of a Federal Aviation Administration (FAA) radar used for Wilkes-Barre/Scranton International Airport. The Red Rock Job Corps Center has been recognized as one of the top Job Corps centers in the nation.

== History ==
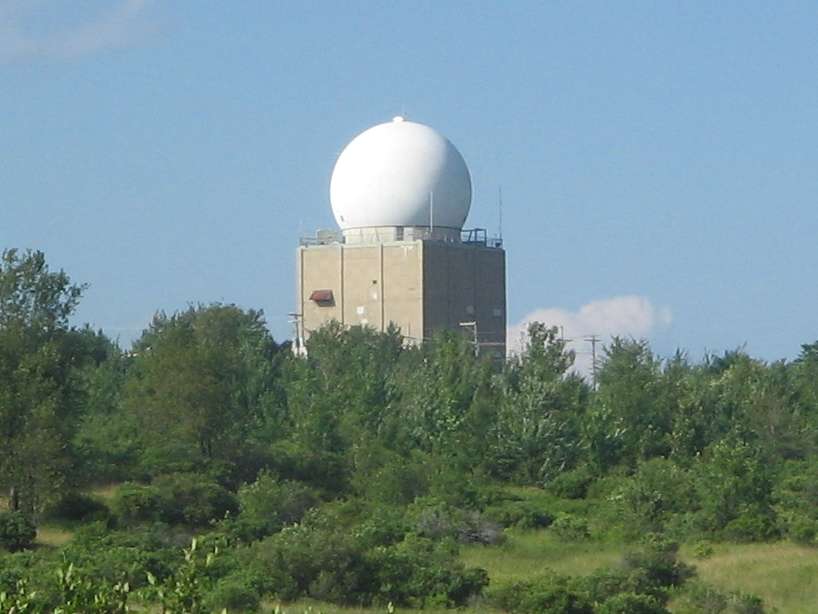
The FAA radar dome in 2010, as seen from Ricketts Glen State Park

The center is within Ricketts Glen State Park, which opened in 1944 and is mostly on land once owned by lumber baron Robert Bruce Ricketts, for whom the park is named. The park is in two physiographic provinces the Allegheny Plateau and the Ridge-and-Valley Appalachians, with the steep escarpment of the Allegheny Front forming the boundary between them. The Allegheny Front within the park is known as North Mountain and Red Rock Mountain, the latter name coming from a red seam of Huntley Mountain Formation shale and sandstone visible along PA 487.

In 1950, construction began on the 98-acre (40 ha) Benton Air Force Station, which was completed on September 21, 1951. In addition to the radar, there were barracks for airmen of the 648th Aircraft Control Squadron, based at Fort Indiantown Gap. In 1963 the Federal Aviation Administration began jointly operating the radar facilities. The Benton Air Force Station closed in 1975, though the FAA continued to operate the radar as an auxiliary service for the nearby Wilkes-Barre/Scranton International Airport. The remaining buildings and barracks were converted to the Red Rock Job Corps Center, which opened in 1978.

The Job Corps program was established by Congress in the Economic Opportunity Act of 1964, part of President Lyndon Johnson's War on Poverty. In 1996, Red Rock Job Corps Center was given the National Director's Award as the "Top Performer" of 110 Job Corps centers in the US. Since 1998, all Job Corps programs now operate under Title I-C. of the Workforce Investment Act. In 2008, the US Department of Labor awarded a contract for $6.4 million for construction of a new dormitory at the center. Until 2010, the center was run by Management and Training Corporation (MTC). On March 17, 2010, the annual contract for operation of Red Rock was awarded to Adams and Associates, Inc. of Reno, Nevada, for $63,275,192. The current operator is Res-Care, Inc. of Louisville, Kentucky.

== Operation ==
Red Rock Job Corps Center is part of the Job Corps, a program administered by the United States Department of Labor that offers education and vocational training free-of-charge to participants from 16 to 24 years old. According to MTC's website for Red Rock, in 2010 it had 318 students, of which 210 were male and 108 female. The center offers driver's education and classes which allow students to earn their high school diploma or their General Educational Development (GED) certificate. Technical training is available for students to become automobile mechanics, brick masons, carpenters, electricians, plumbers, and workers in the business technology and hotel and hospitality fields.
