= Red Rock Mountain =

Mountain in Luzerne County, Pennsylvania

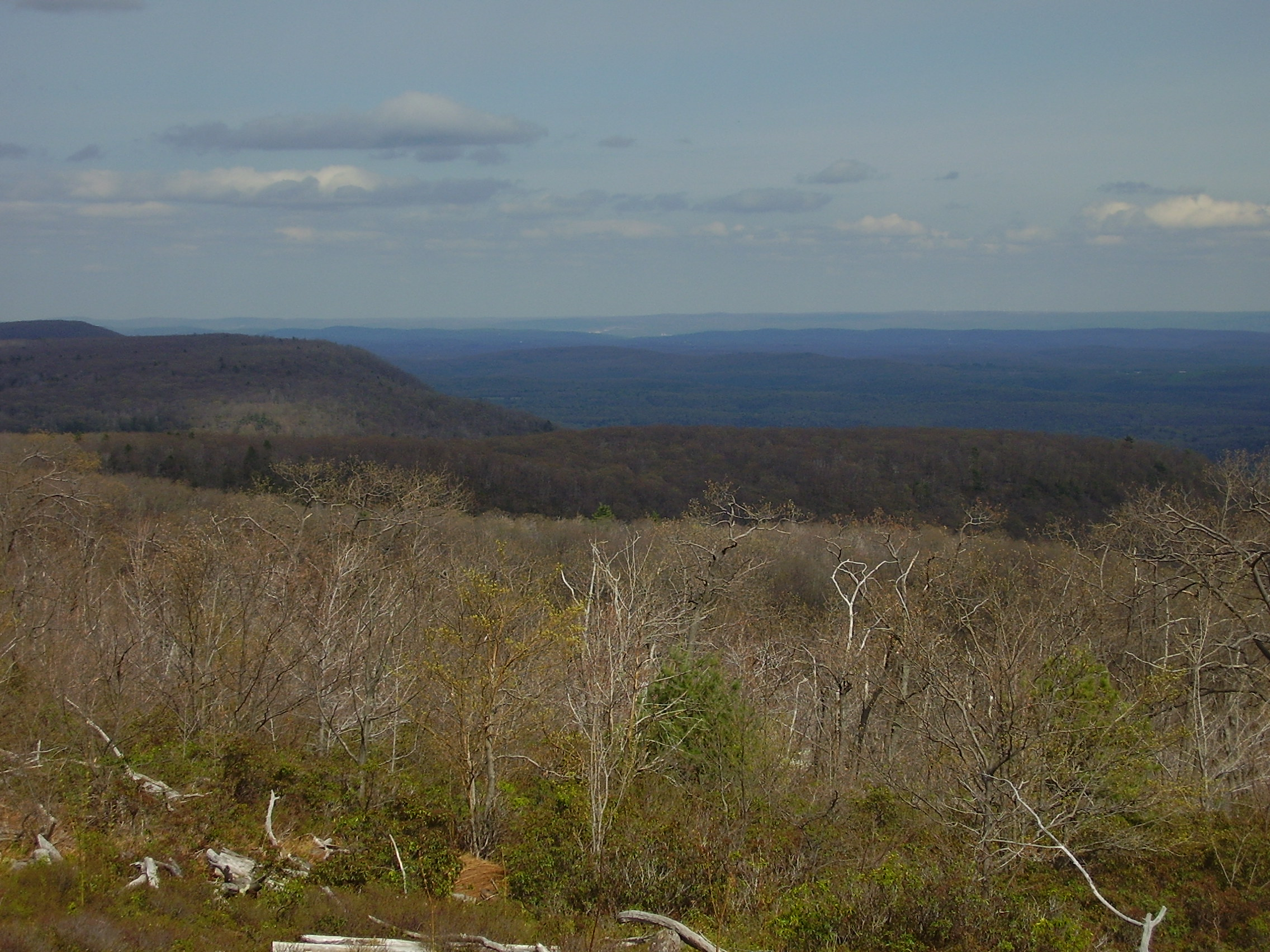
- View from firetower

Highest point
- Elevation: 2,449 ft (746 m) NAVD 88
- Coordinates: 41°18′31″N 76°18′34″W

Geography
- Location: Pennsylvania, U.S.
- Parent range: Appalachian Mountains
- Topo map(s): USGS Red Rock, PA

Red Rock Mountain is a mountain located in Luzerne County, Pennsylvania. This summit is actually on the North Mountain escarpment. The escarpment in which Red Rock Mountain is located is a part of the Allegheny Plateau. This summit features a firetower, known as "Grandview" all located within the Ricketts Glen State Park.

The views from the top of the mountain are impressive and varied. To the south you view the Ridge and Valley Appalachians region, in the other three directions you look out over the deeply dissected Allegheny Plateau. Huckleberry and North Mountain summits may be seen to the west. These mountains are some of the higher peaks in this region of Pennsylvania.
