= Sulfur butterfly =

Several taxa of butterflies are collectively called the Sulphurs or Sulfurs:

- Coliadinae, a subfamily of butterflies commonly known as the sulphurs or yellows
- Dercas, a genus of Coliadinae commonly called the sulphurs
- Colias, a genus of Coliadinae commonly called the sulphurs (in North America) or clouded yellows (elsewhere)
- Phoebis, a genus of Coliadinae that is not itself called the sulphurs but that contains a number of species which are
