= Ricketts (surname) =

Ricketts is a surname, and may refer to:

== A ==
- Abdy Ricketts (1905–1993), British Army officer
- Alfred Ricketts (born 1870), English golfer
- Anthony Ricketts (born 1979), Australian squash player
- Arthur Ricketts, (1913–2000), English cricketer

== B ==
- Bertha Louise Ricketts, original name of Cid Ricketts Sumner (1890–1970), American novelist
- Bob Ricketts (1885–1936), American musician and composer
- Bobby Ricketts, American saxophonist

== C ==
- Cara Ricketts, Canadian actress
- Catherine Ricketts (1841–1907), English missionary
- C'eira Ricketts (born 1990), American basketball player
- Charles Ricketts (1876–1931), British artist and illustrator
- Charles Spencer Ricketts (c.1788–1867), commander with memorial tomb of Charles Spencer Ricketts
- Charlie Ricketts (1885–1960), Australian rules footballer and coach
- Christopher Ricketts (1955–2010), Filipino martial artist and actor
- Chloe Ricketts (born 2007), American soccer player
- Claude V. Ricketts (1906–1964), United States naval admiral
- Clement Ricketts (1885–1961), English Anglican bishop
- Courtney Ricketts (born 1965), English cricketer

== D ==
- Dave Ricketts (1935–2008), American baseball player
- David Ricketts (cyclist) (1920–1996), British cyclist
- David Ricketts (musician) (born 1953), American musician and record producer
- Dick Ricketts (1933–1988), American basketball and baseball player
- Donovan Ricketts (born 1977), Jamaican footballer, goalkeeper with Los Angeles Galaxy

== E ==
- Ed Ricketts (1897–1948), American literary figure and marine biologist
- Edwin D. Ricketts (1867–1937), American lawyer and politician
- Estelle Ricketts (born 1871), American composer

== G ==
- George Ricketts (footballer) (1888–1934), Australian rules footballer
- George Ricketts (cricketer) (1864–1927), English cricketer
- George Poyntz Ricketts (1749–1800), Jamaican-born English plantation owner and governor
- Gordon Ricketts (1918–1968), British administrator at RIBA
- Graham Ricketts (1939–2025), English footballer

== H ==
- Harry Ricketts (born 1950), English poet and biographer
- Henry Ricketts (died 1838), English soldier and administrator
- Hermine Ricketts (1956–2019), Jamaican-born American architect
- Howard Taylor Ricketts (1871–1910), American pathologist

== J ==
- Jamar Ricketts (born 2001), American soccer player
- James Ricketts (cricketer) (1842–1894), English cricketer
- James B. Ricketts (1817–1887), American Civil War general
- Joan Ricketts, Welsh lawn bowler
- Joe Ricketts (born 1941), American brokerage founder
- John Ricketts (chemist) (1924–2007), American chemist
- John Bill Ricketts (1769–1802), English equestrian and circus manager
- Jonathan Ricketts (born 1997), American soccer player
- Joyce Ricketts (1933–1992), American baseball player
- Juan Landázuri Ricketts (1913–1997), cardinal from Peru
- Justin Ricketts (born 1973), English cricketer

== K ==
- Keilani Ricketts (born 1991), American softball player
- Kimberly Ricketts, American politician from New Jersey
- Kweku George Ricketts-Hagan (born 1963), Ghanaian politician

== L ==
- L. D. Ricketts (1859–1940), American geologist, mining engineer and banker
- Laura Ricketts, American co-owner of the Chicago Cubs, gay rights activist, daughter of Joe Ricketts

== M ==
- Mark Ricketts (footballer) (born 1984), English footballer
- Mark Scott Ricketts (born 1955), American comics writer and artist
- Matthew Ricketts (1858–1917), first African American to be elected to the Nebraska legislature, 1892
- Matthew Ricketts (composer) (born 1986), Canadian composer
- Michael Ricketts (born 1978), English footballer
- Michael Ricketts (cricketer) (1923–2004), English British Army officer and cricketer
- Michael Ricketts (musician) (born 1965), American rock musician and songwriter
- Michael Ricketts (football administrator), Jamaican football administrator
- Milton Ernest Ricketts (1913–1942), United States Navy Lieutenant and Medal of Honor recipient

== P ==
- Palmer C. Ricketts (1856–1934), American mechanical engineer and academic
- Patricio Ricketts (1924–2024), Peruvian journalist and politician
- Pete Ricketts (born 1964), American politician
- Peter Ricketts (born 1952), British diplomat
- Philip Ricketts (1945–2018), American lawyer and government official

== R ==
- R. Bruce Ricketts (1839–1918), artillery officer in the American Civil War
- Robert M. Ricketts (1920–2003), American orthodontist
- Rohan Ricketts (born 1982), English footballer
- Ronnie Ricketts, Filipino actor and martial artist

== S ==
- Sam Ricketts (born 1981), Welsh footballer
- Samantha Ricketts (born 1986), American softball player
- Shanieka Ricketts (born 1992), Jamaican athlete

== T ==
- Taylor Ricketts, American ecologist
- Thomas Ricketts (VC) (1901–1967), youngest recipient of the Victoria Cross
- Thomas S. Ricketts, investment bank CEO
- Todd Ricketts (born 1969), American businessman and politician
- Tom Ricketts (1853–1939), American film actor and director
- Tom Ricketts (American football) (born 1965), American football player
- Tom Ricketts (politician), Fiji politician
- Tony Ricketts (born c.1958), British football player and manager
- Tosaint Ricketts (born 1987), Canadian soccer player

== W ==
- William Ricketts (1898–1993), Australian potter and sculptor
- William Reynolds Ricketts (1869–1956), American philatelist

== See also ==
- Isaac Buckley-Ricketts (born 1998), English footballer
- Rickett
