= Sheldon Reynolds =

Sheldon Reynolds may refer to:

- Sheldon Reynolds (producer) (1923–2003), American television producer
- Sheldon Reynolds (guitarist) (1959–2023), American guitarist with Earth, Wind and Fire

== See also ==
- Sheldon Reynolds Falls, a waterfall in Ricketts Glen State Park, Pennsylvania, United States
