= John Ricketts =

John Ricketts may refer to:

- John Ricketts (chemist) (1924–2007), American chemistry educator
- John Bill Ricketts (1769–1835), English equestrian who brought the first modern circus to the United States
- John Peter Ricketts (born 1964), U.S Senator
- Joe Ricketts (born 1941), American businessman
