= George Ricketts =

George Ricketts may refer to:

- George Ricketts (footballer) (1888–1934), Australian rules footballer
- George Ricketts (cricketer) (1864–1927), English cricketer
- George Poyntz Ricketts (1749–1800), Jamaican-born English plantation owner and governor
