= Ricketts =

== Place names ==
In the United States:

- Ricketts, Iowa
- Ricketts Glen State Park in Pennsylvania

== People ==
- Ricketts (surname)

== Vessels ==
- USS Claude V. Ricketts (DDG-5)
- USS Ricketts (DE-254)

== Others ==
- Ricketts baronets, Baronetcy in the Baronetage of the United Kingdom

== See also ==
- Rickets, a medical condition with softening of the bones
