= William Carlos Stone =

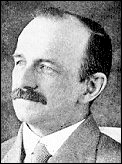
- William Carlos Stone
- Born: October 9, 1859
- Died: February 23, 1939 (aged 79)
- Engineering career
- Institutions: American Philatelic Society
- Projects: Accumulated a large library of philatelic literature related to United States revenue stamps; it was subsequently donated to the Smithsonian Institution
- Awards: APS Hall of Fame

William Carlos Stone (October 9, 1859 – February 23, 1939) was a philatelist who specialized in the collection of philatelic literature related to revenue stamps and postal stationery.

== Collecting interests ==
Stone collected and studied United States revenue stamps, and, at the same time, accumulated a large library consisting mostly of philatelic literature related to revenue stamps. He assisted his fellow philatelist William Reynolds Ricketts in the preparation of Ricketts' famous index of philatelic literature.

== Philatelic activity ==
Stone helped found the American Philatelic Association, which later became the American Philatelic Society, and he continued to support the organization his entire philatelic career.

== Honors and awards ==
Stone was named to the American Philatelic Society Hall of Fame in 1947.

== Legacy ==
Stone's collection of revenue stamp philatelic literature was sold in 1939 to George Townsend Turner, who later donated it to the Smithsonian Institution where it now resides in the National Postal Museum in Washington, D.C.

== See also ==
- Philately
- Philatelic literature
