= USS Marchand =

WWII US naval vessel

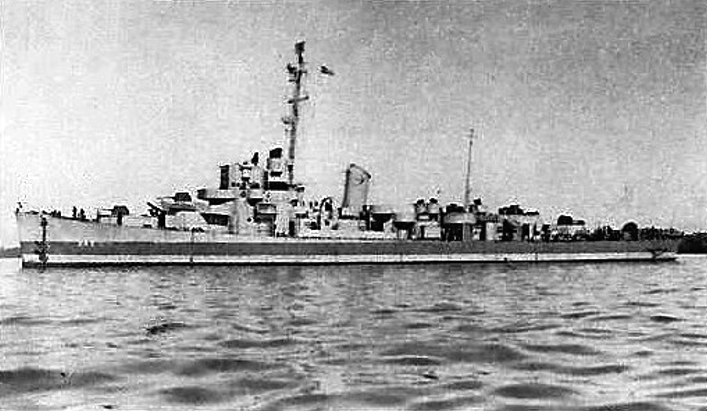

History

United States
- Namesake: Roy Joseph Marchand
- Builder: Brown Shipbuilding Houston, Texas
- Laid down: 30 December 1942
- Launched: 20 March 1943
- Commissioned: 8 September 1943
- Decommissioned: 15 April 1947
- Stricken: 2 January 1971
- Fate: Sold for scrapping 30 January 1974

General characteristics
- Class & type: Edsall-class destroyer escort
- Displacement: 1,253 tons standard; 1,590 tons full load
- Length: 306 feet (93.27 m)
- Beam: 36.58 feet (11.15 m)
- Draft: 10.42 full load feet (3.18 m)
- Propulsion: 4 FM diesel engines, 4 diesel-generators, 6,000 shp (4.5 MW), 2 screws
- Speed: 21 knots (39 km/h)
- Range: 9,100 nmi. at 12 knots; (17,000 km at 22 km/h)
- Complement: 8 officers, 201 enlisted
- Armament: 3 × single 3 in (76 mm)/50 guns; 1 × twin 40 mm AA guns; 8 × single 20 mm AA guns; 1 × triple 21 in (533 mm) torpedo tubes; 8 × depth charge projectors; 1 × depth charge projector (hedgehog); 2 × depth charge tracks

USS Marchand (DE-249) was an Edsall-class destroyer escort in service with the United States Navy from 1943 to 1947. She was scrapped in 1974.

== Namesake ==
Roy Joseph Marchand was born on 17 September 1920, in Crandall, Mississippi. He enlisted in the U.S. Navy on 18 October 1939. After duty on the USS San Francisco, USS Boise and USS Henderson, he was transferred to USS Pecos on 2 May 1940.

On 1 March 1942, planes from the Japanese aircraft carrier Sōryū attacked and sank Pecos near Christmas Island. Assigned to an anti-aircraft gun, Marchand remained at his post until bomb fragments put the gun out of commission; then he acted as messenger for the commanding officer until fatally wounded. Fireman First Class Marchand was posthumously awarded the Silver Star.

== History ==
She was laid down by Brown Shipbuilding Co., Houston, Texas, 30 December 1942; launched 30 March 1943; sponsored by Mrs. Charles D. Marchand, mother of Fireman First Class Marchand; and commissioned 8 September 1943.

=== Battle of the Atlantic ===
Marchand departed Houston, Texas, 14 September for shakedown training off Bermuda until 31 October when she arrived at the Charleston Navy Yard. After antisubmarine warfare exercises while based at Quonset Point, Rhode Island, in November, she arrived at Provincetown, Massachusetts, the 20th. After service as target ship for training operations of Torpedo Squadron 13, the escort ship sailed for Norfolk, Virginia, arriving 12 December.

As the flagship of Escort Division 20, Marchand departed Norfolk 14 December escorting a convoy to Europe, and arrived in the Straits of Gibraltar 2 January 1944 to turn over the convoy to British warships. She then set course for Morocco, arriving Casablanca 7 January. The ship got underway the next day for the east coast, arriving New York 24 January.

Marchand conducted exercises in Block Island Sound and Casco Bay, Maine, until departure from New York 22 February with convoy CU 15 for Ireland. About 2200 on 25 February, during a heavy gale, SS El Coston rammed SS Murfreesboro. As Marchand came to the assistance of the badly damaged and burning merchant ships, El Coston's bow rammed Marchand on her starboard side amidships damaging the plates of her forward control room. Marchand then stood by and received 28 survivors while USS Ricketts (DE-254) took on board 33 others. The next day Marchand steamed for Bermuda as escort for El Coston. Shortly after midnight the 27th the remaining 56 crew members of El Coston had to abandon ship. After the merchant ship sank at 0142, Marchand directed her course for New York, where the survivors were debarked 1 March.

On 6 April Marchand again sailed in convoy from New York for Northern Ireland, arriving Lisahally 17 April. She returned to New York 3 May. From 21 May 1944 to 11 June 1945, she made nine more round trips escorting convoys from New York or Boston, Massachusetts, to United Kingdom ports.

=== Pacific War ===
Marchand departed New York 19 June for training in the Chesapeake Bay, then to Guantanamo Bay, Cuba, before sailing for the South Pacific. She arrived Pearl Harbor 26 July. With the Japanese surrender 15 August, she cleared Pearl Harbor 12 days later for maneuvers off Eniwetok and Kwajalein Atolls, Marshalls, from 3 September to 15 October. She continued on to Guadalcanal, arriving the 18th, before returning to Pearl Harbor 10 November by way of Canton, Phoenix Islands, where she debarked her U.S. Coast Guard passengers.

=== Decommissioning and fate ===
On 17 November the escort ship steamed for home, arriving San Diego, California, 6 days later to debark more men of the Coast Guard. On the 25th Marchand headed for the east coast, via the Panama Canal, reaching New York 11 December. She then got underway 21 January 1946 for Green Cove Springs, Florida, arriving the 23d for inactivation. On 25 April 1947 she decommissioned and entered the Atlantic Reserve Fleet at Green Cove Springs. She was struck from the Navy List on 2 January 1971 and sold for scrapping 30 January 1974.
