= George Townsend Turner =

- Born: February 11, 1906
- Died: August 14, 1979 (aged 73)
- Engineering career
- Institutions: American Philatelic Society; Bureau Issues Association
- Projects: Bibliophile who accumulated one of the largest philatelic libraries, now located at the Smithsonian Institution's National Postal Museum.
- Awards: Luff Award; APS Hall of Fame; Lichtenstein Medal

George Townsend Turner (February 11, 1906 – August 14, 1979) of Washington, D.C., was considered a leading philatelic bibliophile of his era, amassing a very large body of philatelic literature over his lifetime. He was the acting curator of the Smithsonian Institution's philatelic collection from 1959 until 1962 and was the owner of the largest private philatelic library ever assembled.

== Collecting interests ==
Turner was particularly interested in United States revenue stamps and became an expert on the subject, publishing in 1974 "Essays and Proofs of United States Internal Revenue Stamps: A Compilation with Relative Prices."

Turner collected books and other periodicals and catalogs of philatelic literature and purchased large libraries of philatelic books, including the library of revenue collector William Carlos Stone, as well as the immense library of William Reynolds Ricketts.

== Philatelic activity ==
Turner served philately in a number of ways. At the American Philatelic Society he was appointed to the board of directors; at the Smithsonian Institution he was the curator of philatelic collections; and, at the Bureau Issues Association (now the United States Stamp Society), he was the research philatelist. He was also very active in philatelic conventions, and, in 1966, when U.S. philatelic authorities declined to organize an international philatelic exhibition, Turner decided on his own to organize the Sixth International Philatelic Exhibition (SIPEX) in Washington, D.C.

== Honors and awards ==
Numerous awards were given to Turner, including the Luff Award in 1976 for Outstanding Service to the Society, the Lichtenstein Medal in 1976, and in 1978 he signed the Roll of Distinguished Philatelists. In 1980 he was named to the American Philatelic Society Hall of Fame.

== Legacy ==
The majority of Turner's massive library was bequeathed to the Smithsonian Institution where it now resides at the National Postal Museum in Washington, D.C. Through Turner's bequest, the Smithsonian Institution received over 3,000 books and related material which now forms the foundation of the Smithsonian National Postal Museum's library. Turner's collection includes his card catalog along with Ralph A. Kimble's subject index to many philatelic essays and articles which were published in the Philatelic Press, 1935–1950.

== See also ==
- Philately
- Philatelic literature
