= Battery F, 1st Pennsylvania Light Artillery =

Light artillery battery of the Union Army

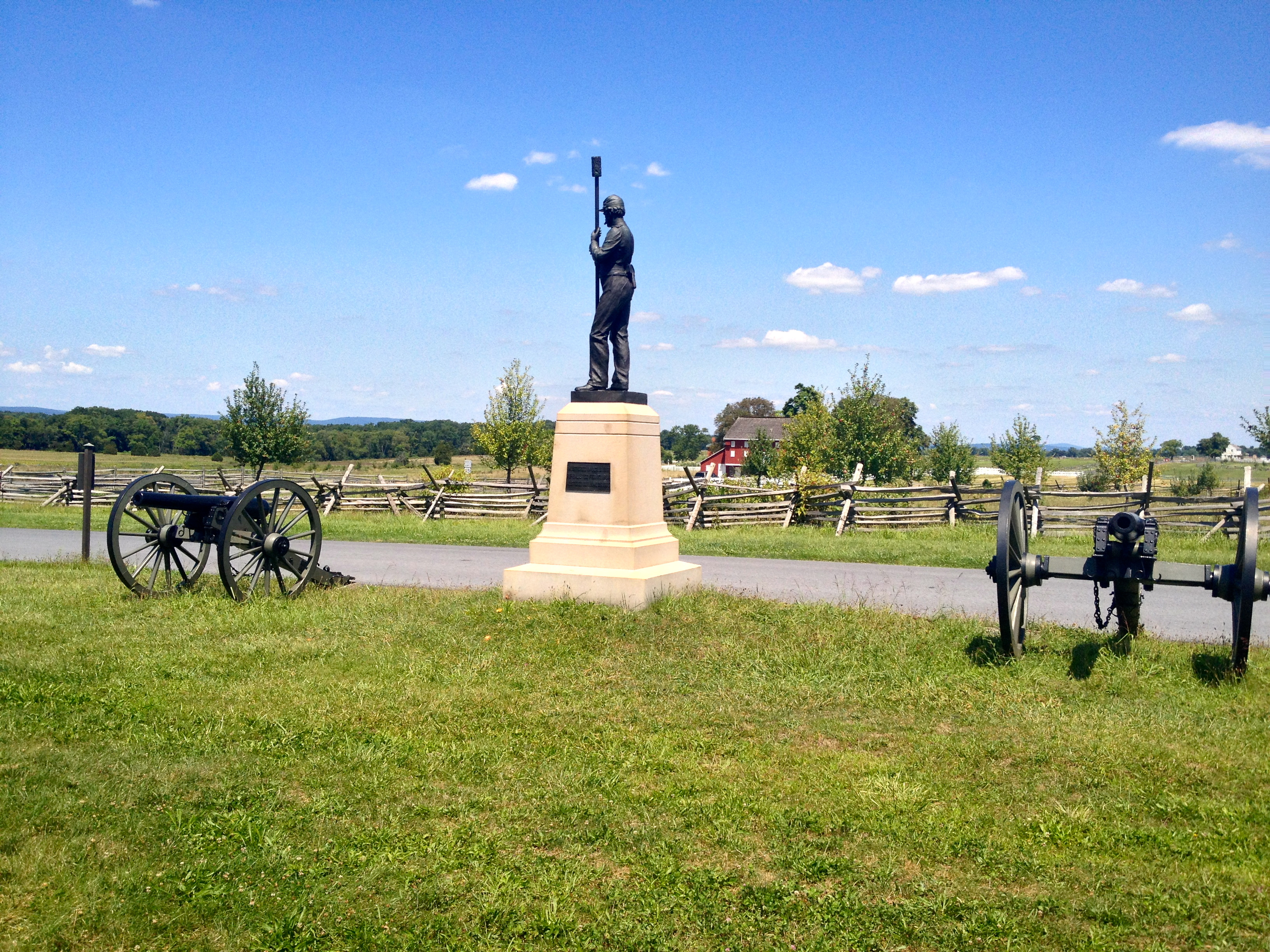
- Monument to Battery F, 1st Pennsylvania Light Artillery at Gettysburg.
- Active: August 5, 1861 - July 9, 1865
- Country: United States
- Allegiance: Union
- Branch: Artillery
- Engagements: Battle of Dranesville; Second Battle of Bull Run; Battle of Antietam; Battle of Fredericksburg; Battle of Chancellorsville; Battle of Gettysburg; Bristoe Campaign; Mine Run Campaign; Battle of the Wilderness; Battle of Spotsylvania Court House; Battle of Cold Harbor; Siege of Petersburg; Battle of Jerusalem Plank Road; First Battle of Deep Bottom; Second Battle of Deep Bottom

Battery F, 1st Pennsylvania Light Artillery was a light artillery battery that served in the Union Army as part of the Pennsylvania Reserves infantry division during the American Civil War.

== Service ==
The battery was organized at Philadelphia, Pennsylvania and mustered in for a three-year enlistment on August 5, 1861, under the command of Captain Ezra Matthews.

The battery was attached to Banks' Division, Army of the Potomac, October 1861 to March 1862. 1st Division, V Corps and 1st Division, Department of the Shenandoah, to May 1862. Artillery, 2nd Division, Department of the Rappahannock, to June 1862. Artillery, 2nd Division, III Corps, Army of Virginia, to September 1862. Artillery, 2nd Division, I Corps, Army of the Potomac, to January 1863. Artillery, 3rd Division, I Corps, to May 1863. 3rd Volunteer Brigade, Artillery Reserve, Army of the Potomac, to July 1863. Artillery Brigade, II Corps, Army of the Potomac, to September 1864. Artillery Reserve, Army of the Potomac, to June 1865.

Battery "B", Pennsylvania Light Artillery mustered out of service July 9, 1865.

== Detailed service ==
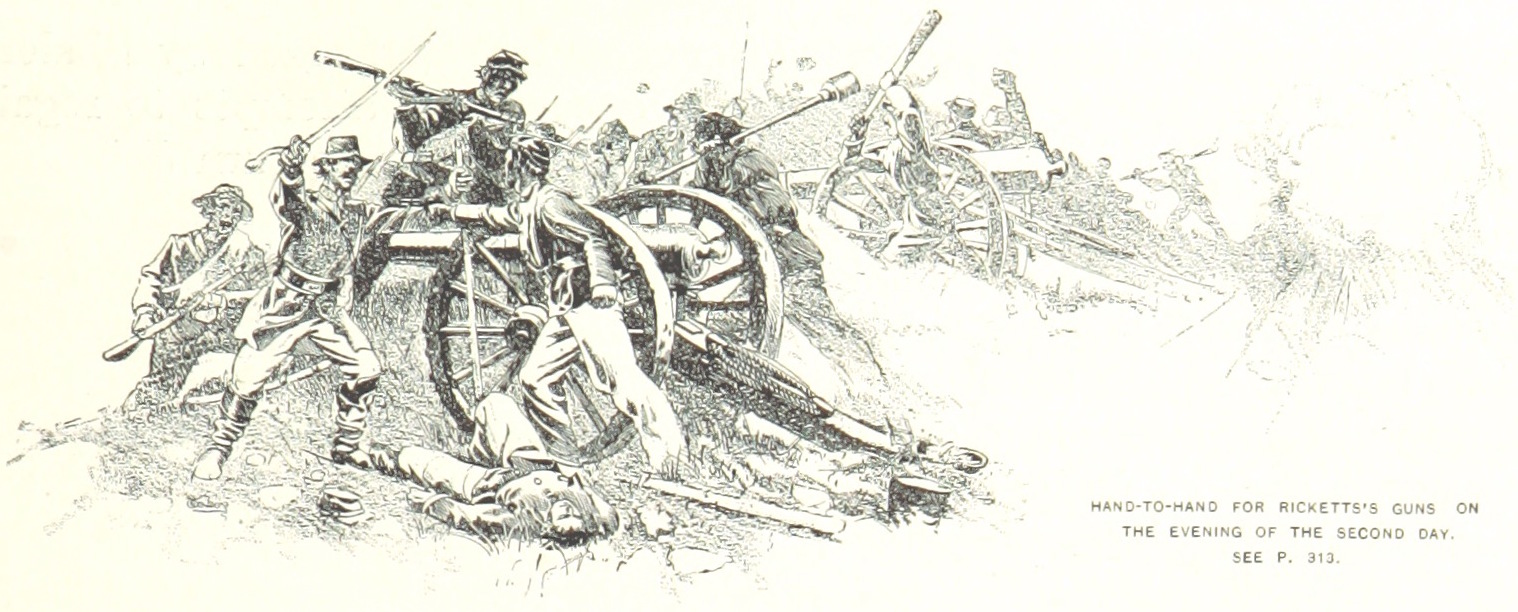
Gunners of Battery F fight Confederates hand to hand at the Battle of Gettysburg

Duty in the defenses of Washington until October 1861 and on the Upper Potomac, between Edward's Ferry and Hancock, Md., until February 1862. Advance on Winchester March 1–12. Reconnaissance toward Strasburg and action near Winchester March 7. Ordered to join Abercrombie's Brigade March 21, and moved to Warrenton Junction. Pursuit of Jackson up the Shenandoah Valley March 24-April 27. Rappahannock Crossing April 18. Pope's Campaign in northern Virginia August 1-September 2. Battle of Cedar Mountain August 9. Fords of the Rappahannock August 21–23. Thoroughfare Gap August 28. Battle of Groveton August 29. Bull Run August 30. Chantilly September 1. Maryland Campaign September 6–24. Battle of Antietam September 16–17. Duty at Sharpsburg, Md., until October 30. Movement to Falmouth, Va., October 30-November 19. Battle of Fredericksburg December 12–15. "Mud March" January 20–24, 1863. At Falmouth and Belle Plain until April. Chancellorsville Campaign April 27-May 6. Operations at Pollock's Mill Creek April 29-May 2. Fitzhugh's Crossing April 29–30. Chancellorsville May 2–5. Gettysburg Campaign June 11-July 24. Battle of Gettysburg July 2–4. Advance to line of the Rapidan September 13–17. Bristoe Campaign October 9–22. Auburn and Bristoe October 14. Advance to line of the Rappahannock November 7–8. Mine Run Campaign November 26-December 2. Demonstration on the Rapidan February 6–7, 1864. Morton's Ford February 6–7. Camp near Stevensburg, Va., until May. Rapidan Campaign May 4-June 12. Battle of the Wilderness May 5–7. Spotsylvania May 8–12. Spotsylvania Court House May 12–21. Assault on the Salient May 12. North Anna River May 23–26. Line of the Pamunkey May 26–28. Totopotomoy May 28–31. Cold Harbor June 1–12. Before Petersburg June 16–18. Siege of Petersburg June 16, 1864 to April 2, 1865. Jerusalem Plank Road June 21–22, 1864. Demonstration north of the James River at Deep Bottom July 27–29. Deep Bottom July 27–29. Demonstration north of the James at Deep Bottom August 13–20. Strawberry Plains August 14–18. Fall of Petersburg April 2, 1865. Moved to Washington, D.C., May. Grand Review of the Armies May 23.

== Casualties ==
The battery lost a total of 31 men during service; 1 officer and 17 enlisted men killed or mortally wounded, 13 enlisted men died of disease.

== Commanders ==
- Captain Ezra Matthews
- Captain Robert Bruce Ricketts
- Lieutenant Beldin Spence - commanded during the Mine Run Campaign

== See also ==
- List of Pennsylvania Civil War Units
- Pennsylvania in the Civil War
