= Rickett =

Surname

Rickett is a surname. Notable people with the surname include:

- Arthur Compton-Rickett (1869–1937), English author and editor
- Harold Rickett (1909–1969), English rower who competed at the 1932 Summer Olympics
- Horace Rickett (1912–1989), English footballer
- Joseph Compton-Rickett (1847–1919), Liberal Party politician in England
- Sophy Rickett (born 1970), visual artist, working with photography and video/sound installation
- Thomas Rickett, creator of the Rickett (car) in 1860, a steam-powered car from Buckingham, England
- W. Allyn Rickett, American historian
- Walter Rickett (1917–1991), professional footballer who played as a winger
- William Rickett or William Ricketts (1898–1993), Australian potter and sculptor of the arts and crafts movement

== See also ==
- Racket (disambiguation)
- Rackett
- Rickets
- Ricketts (disambiguation)
- Rocket
