= Marcia Bonta =

American naturalist and writer

- Education: Bucknell University
- Known for: writings about Pennsylvanian flora and fauna
- Scientific career
- Fields: natural history

Marcia Myers Bonta (born 1940) is an American naturalist and writer, known for her extensive writings about Pennsylvanian flora and fauna.

== Biography ==
Marcia Bonta was born on July 11, 1940, in Camden, New Jersey. She earned a BA degree from Bucknell University in 1962, and has done extensive research on the history of women naturalists. She is the author of more than 300 articles and a long-running column in the Pennsylvania Game News.

== Selected works ==
- Escape to the Mountain, A. S. Barnes (San Diego, CA), 1980
- Outbound Journeys in Pennsylvania, Pennsylvania State University Press (University Park, PA), 1988
- Appalachian Spring, University of Pittsburgh Press (Pittsburgh, PA), 1991
- Women in the Field: America's Pioneering Women Naturalists, Texas A&M University Press (College Station, TX), 1991
- Appalachian Autumn, University of Pittsburgh Press (Pittsburgh, PA), 1994
- American Women Afield: Writings by Pioneering Women Naturalists, Editor, Texas A&M University Press (College Station, TX), 1995
- More Outbound Journeys in Pennsylvania, Pennsylvania State University Press (University Park, PA), 1995
- Appalachian Summer, University of Pittsburgh Press (Pittsburgh, PA), 1999
- Appalachian Winter, University of Pittsburgh Press (Pittsburgh, PA), 2005

== Awards ==
- 1989: Book of the year award from Pennsylvania Outdoor Writers Association for Outbound Journeys in Pennsylvania.
