= USS Ricketts =

1943 Edsall-class destroyer escort

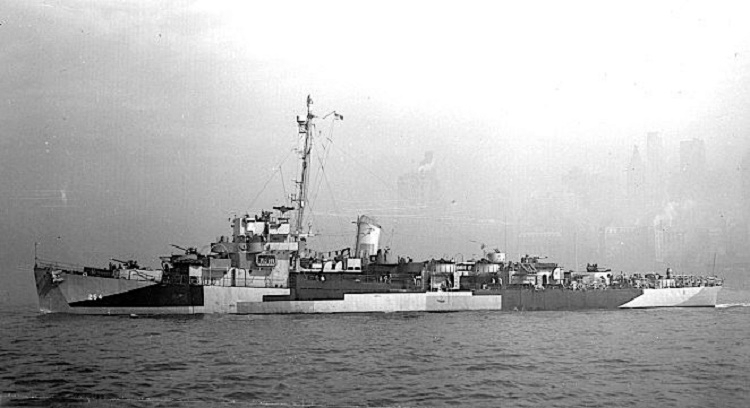

History

United States
- Name: Ricketts
- Namesake: Milton Ernest Ricketts
- Builder: Brown Shipbuilding Houston, Texas
- Laid down: 16 March 1943
- Launched: 10 May 1943
- Commissioned: 5 October 1943
- Decommissioned: 17 April 1946
- Stricken: 1 November 1972
- Fate: Sold for scrapping, 18 January 1974

General characteristics
- Class & type: Edsall-class destroyer escort
- Displacement: 1,253 tons standard; 1,590 tons full load
- Length: 306 ft (93.3 m)
- Beam: 36.58 ft (11.1 m)
- Draft: 10.42 ft (3.2 m)
- Propulsion: 4 × FM diesel engines, 4 × diesel-generators, 6,000 shp (4,500 kW), 2 × screws
- Speed: 21 knots (39 km/h; 24 mph)
- Range: 9,100 nmi (16,900 km; 10,500 mi) at 12 knots (22 km/h; 14 mph)
- Complement: 8 officers, 201 enlisted
- Armament: 3 × single 3 in (76 mm)/50 guns; 1 × twin 40 mm AA guns; 8 × single 20 mm AA guns; 1 × triple 21 in (533 mm) torpedo tubes; 8 × depth charge projectors; 1 × depth charge projector (hedgehog); 2 × depth charge tracks

USS Ricketts (DE-254) was an Edsall-class destroyer escort in service with the United States Navy from 1943 to 1946. She was scrapped in 1974.

== History ==
She was named in honor of Milton Ernest Ricketts who was awarded the Medal of Honor posthumously for his valiant actions during the Battle of the Coral Sea. Ricketts a destroyer escort, was laid down on 16 March 1943 by Brown Shipbuilding Co., Houston, Texas; launched on 10 May 1943; sponsored by Mrs. Milton E. Ricketts, widow of Milton Ricketts; and commissioned on 5 October 1943 at Houston.

=== Battle of the Atlantic ===
After outfitting at Galveston, Texas, and Algiers, Louisiana, Ricketts sailed to Bermuda for shakedown. She arrived Charleston, South Carolina, 28 November 1943, escorting the merchant ship SS Braga. Following post-shakedown overhaul, the escort got underway 9 December for New York City, where she joined a convoy destined for North Africa. The convoy cleared on the 14th, but Ricketts delayed her departure until the following day to wait for two late-loading merchant ships.

The three ships joined the main body of the convoy on 20 December and continued on to Casablanca, French Morocco. Ricketts returned to New York on 24 January 1944, thus completing her only convoy run to the Mediterranean Sea.

Ricketts sailed from New York on 22 February 1944 on the first of twelve escort voyages to Northern Europe and back. She saw a burst of flame in the convoy at 2035 on the stormy night of 25 February. Two merchant tankers, SS El Coston and SS Murfreesboro had collided, and both ships were badly damaged and burning. Ricketts snatched 33 survivors from the sea, which was covered with blazing gasoline. Her commanding officer received the Bronze Star for his part in this daring rescue, and two other officers and six enlisted men received the Navy and Marine Corps Medal.

Rejoining the convoy, Ricketts received Capt. John Roundtree, Commander, Escort Division 20, when his own flagship, USS Marchand departed to escort the badly damaged El Coston to Bermuda. The convoy continued on to Lough Foyle, Northern Ireland, and Ricketts anchored at Lisahally from 6–12 March. She then sailed with a return convoy to New York, arriving on 22 March.

Ricketts made eleven other round-trip escort voyages: first from New York to Lough Foyle and back (6 April – 3 May 1944); then from New York to Lough Foyle to Boston, Massachusetts (21 May – 17 June 1944); followed by three voyages from New York to Lough Foyle and back (2–27 July; 11 August – 5 September; and 20 September – 16 October 1944). Others were from New York to the River Clyde, Scotland, and return (7 November – 7 December); from New York to Cherbourg, France, and the Isle of Portland, England, and back (26 December 1944 – 23 January 1945); from New York to Le Havre, France, and Southampton, England, and back (31 March – 30 April 1945); and from New York to Southampton and back (20 May – 11 June 1945).

=== Pacific War ===
Ricketts sailed from New York on 19 June 1945 with the remainder of Escort Division 20 for the Pacific. After exercises in Chesapeake Bay and refresher training at Guantanamo Bay, Cuba, she transited the Panama Canal 7 July. She called at San Diego, California, for a five-day visit and departed 20 July, steaming independently for Pearl Harbor and arriving one week later. A month of intensive training in Hawaiian waters followed. She sailed for Eniwetok on 27 August in company with nine other ocean escorts, arriving there on 3 September.

Ordered to accept the surrender and to help establish the occupation of isolated Japanese garrisons, Ricketts got underway for Kusaie, the Carolines, one week later to assist in the disarming of the Japanese on that bypassed island, and to set up a military government. Further duty included the repatriation of natives of Ponape and Kusaie to their home islands.

Returning to Eniwetok on 14 October, Ricketts remained on patrol there until 3 November, when she departed for Pearl Harbor. Following training at Pearl Harbor from 9–24 November, she continued on to San Diego, California, arriving there the last day of the month. She next cleared port on 2 December 1945, took on passengers at Coco Solo, Panama Canal Zone, and arrived at the Brooklyn Navy Yard on 16 December. Departing New York Harbor on 21 January 1946, she reported for inactivation at Green Cove Springs, Florida.

=== Decommissioning and fate ===
Arriving Green Cove Springs on 23 January, she decommissioned and joined the Florida Group, Atlantic Reserve Fleet on 17 April 1946. Ricketts remained in reserve status, berthed at Green Cove Springs, into 1961, when she shifted to the Texas Group, Atlantic Reserve Fleet, Orange, Texas. She remained berthed at Orange, Texas, until sold for scrapping on 18 January 1974 to Andy International, Inc., of Brownsville, Texas.

== Awards ==
Navy historical records, which are not always complete, do not indicate whether Ricketts was awarded battle stars. However, records do note that her commanding officer was awarded the Bronze Medal and that two other officers and six enlisted men received the Navy and Marine Corps Medal for the valiant actions performed by this warship.
