= Taylor Ricketts =

American ecologist

- Born: Washington, US

Academic background
- Education: BA, Earth Sciences, 1991, Dartmouth College; PhD, Biological Sciences, 2000, Stanford University
- Thesis: Distribution and dispersal of species in natural and human-dominated landscapes

Academic work
- Institutions: University of Vermont; World Wide Fund for Nature

Taylor Henry Ricketts is an American ecologist. He is the director of the University of Vermont's Gund Institute for Environment and Gund Professor at the Rubenstein School of Environment and Natural Resources. Ricketts is a Fellow of both the American Association for the Advancement of Science and the Ecological Society of America. In 2015, Thompson-Reuters named him as one of the world's most cited and influential scientists.

== Early life and education ==
Ricketts, a native of Washington, US, completed his Bachelor of Arts degree in earth sciences at Dartmouth College and PhD in biological sciences at Stanford University. Following his PhD, Ricketts contributed to the Millennium Ecosystem Assessment.

== Career ==
=== World Wildlife Fund ===
Following his PhD, Ricketts joined the World Wide Fund for Nature’s Conservation Science Program and served as their director from 2002 to 2012. In this role, he focused on delineating the ecoregions of the world and co-founded the Natural Capital Project with Gretchen Daily and Peter Kareiva. The project is a consortium of universities and NGOs focused on mapping and valuing ecosystem services. He also pinpointed species in imminent danger of extinction worldwide.

=== University of Vermont ===
In 2012, Ricketts joined the University of Vermont as the director of Gund Institute for Ecological Economics and professor in the Rubenstein School of Environment and Natural Resources. The following year, Ricketts co-authored Human Health Impacts of Ecosystem Alteration in the Proceedings of the National Academy of Sciences of the United States of America. In the paper, his research team identified repeated correlations between changes in natural systems and existing and potential human health outcomes. In 2015, Thompson-Reuters named him as one of the world’s most cited and influential scientists.

Due to the Pollinator decline, Ricketts and Insu Koh partnered with the Integrated Crop Pollination Project and Azavea software to create a mobile app to help farmers save bees. The app built on the first national map of U.S. wild bees and allowed users to "enter their address, and start adding best practices for boosting pollination.” Following this, he was appointed the founding director of the University of Vermont's first university-wide environmental institute. In 2018 and 2019, Ricketts was twice named to the Highly Cited Researchers list by Clarivate Analytics.

In 2020, Ricketts was elected a Fellow of the Ecological Society of America for "his contributions to understanding ecosystems and the services they provide for human well-being; his discoveries related to pollination services for crops; and his unique ability to bridge the science and decision-making worlds, ensuring that new knowledge about ecosystems services is used by decision-makers in conservation communities and beyond." Later that year, he was also elected as a fellow of the American Association for the Advancement of Science.

== Selected publications ==
- A field guide to economics for conservationists (2014)
- Natural capital: Theory and practice of mapping ecosystem services (2011)
- Status of pollinators in North America (2006)
- Terrestrial ecoregions of Africa and its islands: a conservation assessment (2004)
- Ecosystems and human well-being: A framework for assessment (2003) ISBN 978-1-55963-403-8.
- Ecoregions of North America: A conservation assessment (1999)

== Personal life ==
Ricketts is married and has two children.
