= Milton Ernest Ricketts =

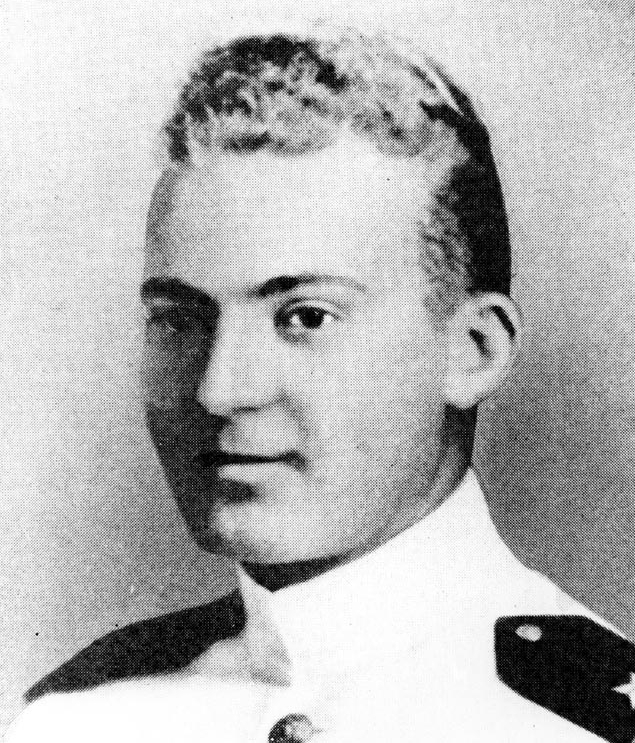
- Lieutenant Milton E. Ricketts
- Born: August 5, 1913; Baltimore, Maryland
- Died: May 8, 1942 (aged 28); Coral Sea
- Burial place: buried at sea
- Military career
- Allegiance: United States of America
- Branch: United States Navy
- Service years: 1935 - 1942
- Rank: Lieutenant
- Units: USS Ranger (CV-4); USS Yorktown (CV-5)
- Conflicts: World War II; *Battle of the Coral Sea †
- Awards: Medal of Honor; Purple Heart

Milton Ernest Ricketts (August 5, 1913 – May 8, 1942) was a United States Navy officer and a recipient of the United States military's highest decoration—the Medal of Honor—for his actions in World War II.

Ricketts graduated from the Baltimore City College high school and then from the U.S. Naval Academy in 1935 and subsequently served on the USS Ranger (CV-4) and USS Yorktown (CV-5). On May 8, 1942, during the Battle of the Coral Sea, Lieutenant Ricketts was in charge of a damage control party on board the Yorktown. When a Japanese bomb exploded among his group, he successfully undertook fire-fighting measures despite having received mortal wounds. For this act, Ricketts was posthumously awarded the Medal of Honor.

Ricketts was buried at sea; his name appears on the Tablets of the Missing at Manila American Cemetery and Memorial in the Philippines.

== Medal of Honor citation ==
Lieutenant Ricketts' official Medal of Honor citation reads:

For extraordinary and distinguished gallantry above and beyond the call of duty as Officer-in-Charge of the Engineering Repair Party of the U.S.S. Yorktown in action against enemy Japanese forces in the Battle of the Coral Sea on 8 May 1942. During the severe bombarding of the Yorktown by enemy Japanese forces, an aerial bomb passed through and exploded directly beneath the compartment in which Lt. Ricketts' battle station was located, killing, wounding or stunning all of his men and mortally wounding him. Despite his ebbing strength, Lt. Ricketts promptly opened the valve of a near-by fireplug, partially led out the fire hose and directed a heavy stream of water into the fire before dropping dead beside the hose. His courageous action, which undoubtedly prevented the rapid spread of fire to serious proportions, and his unflinching devotion to duty were in keeping with the highest traditions of the U.S. Naval Service. He gallantly gave his life for his country.

== Awards and decorations ==

1st row	Medal of Honor		
2nd row	Purple Heart	Combat Action Ribbon Retroactively Awarded, 1999	American Defense Service Medal with Fleet clasp
3rd row	American Campaign Medal	Asiatic-Pacific Campaign Medal with 2 Campaign stars	World War II Victory Medal

== Namesake ==
The Edsall-class destroyer escort USS Ricketts (DE-254) was named in his honor.

== See also ==
- List of Medal of Honor recipients
