= R. Bruce Ricketts =

Civil War artillery officer

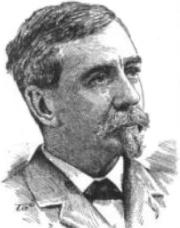
- Born: Robert Bruce Ricketts; April 29, 1839; Orangeville, Pennsylvania
- Died: November 13, 1918 (aged 79); Ganoga Lake, Pennsylvania
- Occupation(s): Merchant, farmer, military officer
- Spouse: Elizabeth Reynolds (m. 1868)
- Children: William Reynolds; Jean Holberton; Frances Leigh

Robert Bruce Ricketts (April 29, 1839 – November 13, 1918) distinguished himself as an artillery officer in the American Civil War. He is best known for his battery's defense against a Confederate attack on Cemetery Hill on the second day of the Battle of Gettysburg on July 2, 1863.

== Early life ==
Elijah Ricketts was a merchant and farmer in Orangeville in Columbia County, Pennsylvania. He married Margaret Leigh Lockart (1810–1891) in 1830. Robert Bruce Ricketts was the fifth of nine children of this union, born on April 29, 1839. An older brother, William Wallace Ricketts (b. 1837), attended the United States Military Academy; but he died in 1862. Bruce Ricketts was educated at the Wyoming Seminary near Wilkes-Barre. When the war broke out, he was studying law and considering the possibility of a university education.

== Early Civil War ==
The First Pennsylvania Light Artillery (otherwise known as the 43rd Regiment Pennsylvania Volunteers) was organized in 1861. The regiment left for Washington, D.C. in August of that year. Battery F was formed under Capt. Ezra W. Matthews. Bruce Ricketts joined the service on July 8, as a private of that year, and he was commissioned as first lieutenant in that battery about a month later. The regiment was split up, with individual batteries serving with different divisions of the Army of the Potomac. Battery F first saw combat at the Battle of Dranesville on December 20, 1861. Ricketts' section had one gun disabled in that action. Later the section served in the defense of Hancock, Maryland, against a foray by Stonewall Jackson.

Battery F served in the Army of Virginia in the corps of Major General Irwin McDowell, joining it on March 21, 1862, at Warrenton, Virginia. In that context it was involved, under Ricketts' leadership, in a reconnaissance expedition to Rappahannock Station, Virginia, that left on April 7, of that year. This force advanced and then withdrew, having accomplished its information-gathering purpose. Thereafter the battery was involved in the campaign culminating in the Second Battle of Bull Run. Battery F was seriously engaged in the Battle of Cedar Mountain on August 8, helping McDowell cover the retreat of the corps of Major General Nathaniel Banks. The battery helped defend Henry House Hill at Second Bull Run, and it was present at the Battle of Chantilly though not engaged. It also participated in the "artillery hell" of the Battle of Antietam. Lt. Ricketts missed most of these actions while serving on recruiting duty. He returned to the Army of the Potomac on September 23, 1862.

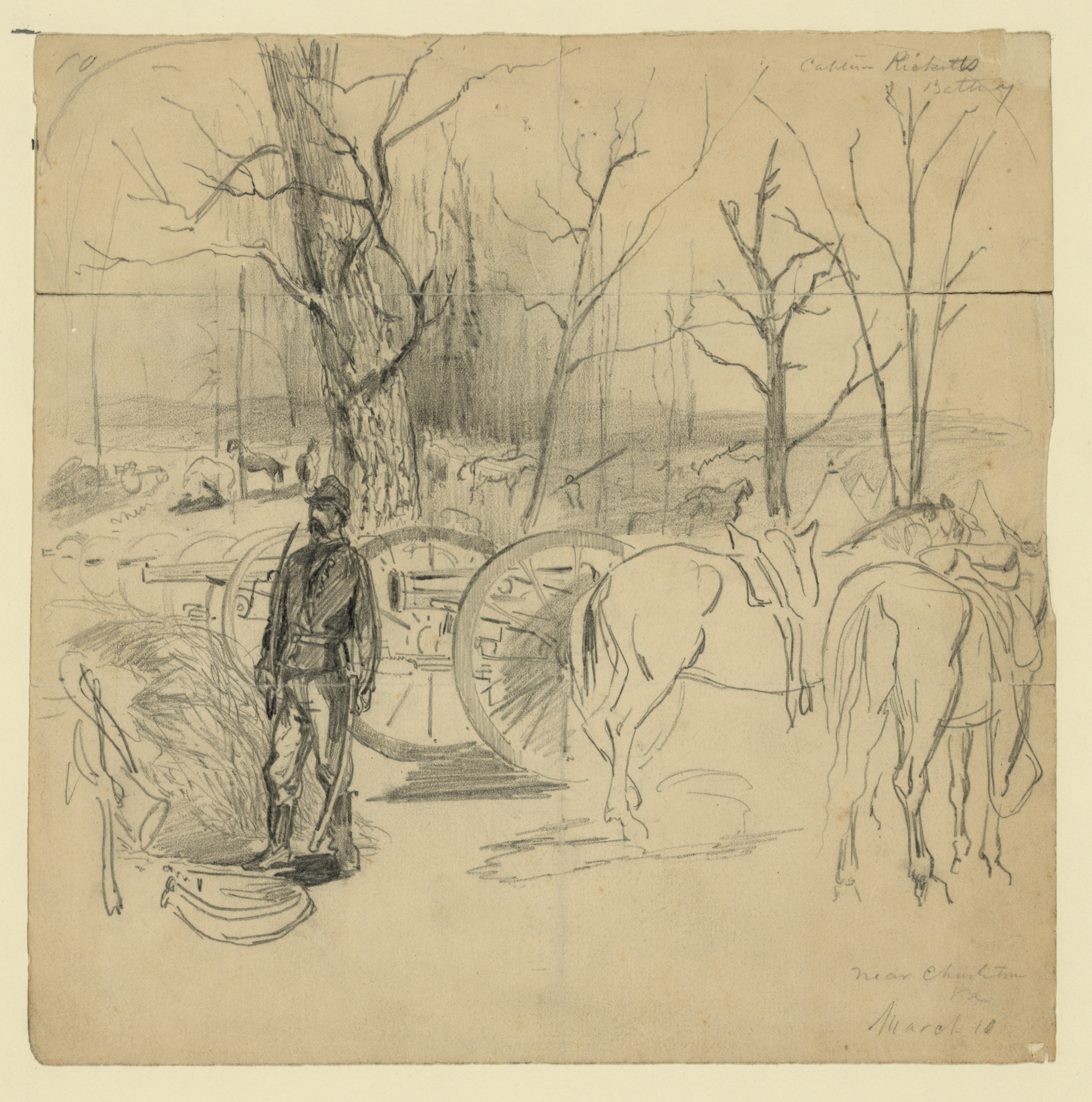
Rickett's Battery sketched by Alfred Waud

Ricketts commanded Battery F, First Pennsylvania Light Artillery from then on until the summer of 1864. Capt. Matthews went down ill and did not return to battery command. Ricketts was engaged with his guns at the Battle of Fredericksburg, serving with second division I Corps under Major General John F. Reynolds. When Capt. Matthews was promoted to the rank of major, Ricketts became a captain on March 14, 1863. At the Battle of Chancellorsville Ricketts' battery was with Major General Abner Doubleday's third division I Corps.

== Gettysburg ==
Ricketts' battery was – beginning on May 13, 1863 – in the third volunteer brigade of the Reserve Artillery under Capt. James F. Huntington. Battery G, First Pennsylvania Light Artillery, was attached to Ricketts' battery a few weeks before the Battle of Gettysburg, on June 1, 1863. This merger was resented until gunners from Battery G were permitted to form a section of the consolidated battery. This merger took place while the army was marching north in pursuit of the Army of Northern Virginia, beginning on May 15.

Ricketts' battery arrived in Gettysburg on the Taneytown Road on the morning of July 2, 1863, and replaced Capt. James H. Cooper's Battery B, First Pennsylvania Light Artillery, on East Cemetery Hill about 4:00 PM. It was exposed to enfilade fire from Benner's Hill and Seminary Ridge. Around nightfall, two Confederate brigades from the division of Major General Jubal Early attacked the hill. It broke the thin Union front line at the foot of the hill in two places. In other places they were repelled. Some Confederates reached the top of the hill, and one group attacked the left of Ricketts' battery, trying to spike the guns. The fight for the guns became hand to hand, but the Confederates were unable to capture the whole battery. Eventually Union reinforcements from the II Corps brigade of Col. Samuel S. Carroll drove the Confederates down hill. A monument to the battery stands in the general location of their fight.

After the battle, Ricketts criticized Adelbert Ames' division of XI Corps, although he probably could not see what was going on down there at the foot of the hill. He thought they fled unnecessarily. Ricketts' account of the action makes it look as if his battery stood alone for an extended time. However, a less colorful account by a modern historian shows that some of the XI Corps troops had rallied and stood fast atop Cemetery Hill even before reinforcements from Col. Carroll's brigade of II Corps came up behind Ricketts' position.

== After Gettysburg ==
After Gettysburg, Ricketts' battery F was transferred to the artillery brigade of II Corps in time for the Bristoe Campaign. At the Second Battle of Auburn on October 14, 1863, the battery helped first division II Corps cover the withdrawal of the corps under harassing fire from horse artillery of Major General J. E. B. Stuart's command. At the Battle of Bristoe Station later that day, Ricketts' battery F came up at a gallop and unlimbered behind BG Alexander S. Webb's second division II Corps. Their fire helped defeat Major General Henry Heth's attack on the federal line. The battery was given the privilege of presenting captured Confederate guns to Major General George G. Meade, the commanding general.

Ricketts' battery remained with the II Corps for the Overland Campaign. During the Battle of the Wilderness, a section of Ricketts' battery advanced on the Plank Road with Major General Winfield Scott Hancock's attack on the Confederate lines on May 5, 1864, at about 3:30 PM. The section accompanied BG George Getty's division of VI Corps, serving with Hancock at that time. A Confederate counterattack captured the section, but Col. Carroll's brigade recaptured the guns by 6:00 PM. BG Getty praised Ricketts for his "great coolness and courage" in this action.

Ricketts was engaged in support of Grant's offensive attacks on the Confederate positions in the Battle of Spotsylvania Court House on May 18, 1864, being moved up close to the captured Confederate works. He also supported Hancock's attack on Henagan's redoubt at the Battle of North Anna on May 23. The battery remained with II Corps throughout the remainder of the campaign, except at the Battle of Cold Harbor, when it was detached to serve with XVIII Corps on June 3.

Ricketts' battery crossed the James River with II Corps and participated in the Second Battle of Petersburg. Battery F fired some of the first federal shots into the beleaguered city. Ricketts' guns were on the battle front for two weeks until they were relieved by a battery from V Corps.

During the subsequent siege of Petersburg, Ricketts was promoted to higher ranks in the First Pennsylvania Light Artillery. When Major James H. Cooper reached the expiration of his term of service on August 8, 1864, Ricketts was named his successor. When, in 1865, Colonel R. M. West was commissioned colonel of the Fifth Pennsylvania Cavalry, Major Ricketts was promoted to the rank of colonel in his place to date from March 15.

During the early stages of the siege, Ricketts continued in command of his battery with II Corps. This included a role supporting BG Gershom Mott's division in the Second Battle of Deep Bottom. After returning to the Petersburg front, the battery was assigned to positions near the Jerusalem Plank Road. During this period, Capt. Ricketts presided over a court of inquiry into the loss of a gun at the Second Battle of Ream's Station. He also served on a board deciding which units could add the names of particular battles to their flags. In December 1864, Ricketts, as "acting major," commanded the II Corps batteries serving on the lines of IX Corps for a period of three weeks.

In 1865, Ricketts played a role in the Artillery Reserve; and, by the spring of 1865 he was assistant chief of artillery of IX Corps. Whenever the chief of artillery, Colonel John C. Tidball, was absent, Ricketts took charge of the guns of IX Corps in his place.

The report that a Confederate veteran looked at Ricketts, a slight man, and commented, "And did this little cuss command Battery Hell!," may be apocryphal.

== Post-war ==
After the war, Ricketts, with his father and an uncle, began buying timber land in Columbia, Luzerne and Sullivan counties. By 1873, they had ca. 66,000 acres (270 km^{2}). In 1872 Ricketts and partners opened a saw mill. He used his own lumber to build North Mountain House at Ganoga Lake in the area where he had his timber lands. The house took guests until 1903, when it became his family's summer home. Ricketts' interests suffered financial hardship in the years 1883 to 1885, and he had to sell off much of his land.

Ricketts married Elizabeth Reynolds in Wilkes-Barre, Pennsylvania, on October 1, 1868. They had three children: William Reynolds (1869–1956); Jean Holberton (1873–1929), and Frances Leigh (1881–1970). Lakes Jean and Leigh are named for their two daughters.

Ricketts belonged to the Grand Army of the Republic and the Military Order of the Loyal Legion of the United States. The colonel was politically active too. He supported Major General Winfield Scott Hancock for president in 1880.

At his death on November 14, 1918, at Ganoga Lake, Ricketts still owned about 80,000 acres (320 km^{2}) around Red Rock Mountain in Columbia, Luzerne and Sullivan counties, including Ganoga Lake (or Long Pond) and Lake Jean. Ricketts was buried nearby. His heirs sold much of this timber land to the state of Pennsylvania via the Central Penn Lumber Company 1920-1924. This land became the nucleus of Ricketts Glen State Park.

== See also ==
- Battle of Gettysburg
