= John Ricketts (chemist) =

American chemist, chemistry educator and academic

John A. Ricketts
- Born: February 29, 1924; Lakewood, Ohio
- Died: June 29, 2007 (aged 83); Bloomington, Indiana
- Citizenship: American
- Education: Indiana University Bloomington
- Occupations: American chemist, chemistry educator and academic
- Spouse: Lucille (Reininga) Ricketts
- Children: Thomas Ricketts; Sally Ricketts
- Parents: Virgil A. Ricketts (father); Lucille (Reininga) Ricketts (mother)

John A. Ricketts (February 29, 1924 – June 29, 2007) was an American chemist, chemistry educator and academic. He was a former Simeon Smith Professor of Chemistry at DePauw University. He was lecturer in chemistry at Fenn College (which later became Cleveland State University) in Cleveland, Ohio. before joining DePauw. He was director of graduate studies at DePauw from 1966 until 1970.

== Selected publications ==
- Ricketts, John A. (August 1967). "Chemistry graduate students at non-PhD-granting institutions: Selection and judging procedures". Journal of Chemical Education. 44 (8): 447. Bibcode:1967JChEd..44..447R. doi:10.1021/ed044p447. ISSN 0021-9584.
- Ricketts, John (1982-10-15). "Chapter 18: ADAPT: A View from a Distant Campus". Essays from and About the ADAPT Program.
- Ricketts, John A. (June 1960). "A laboratory exercise emphasizing deductive chemical reasoning". Journal of Chemical Education. 37 (6): 311. Bibcode:1960JChEd..37..311R. doi:10.1021/ed037p311. ISSN 0021-9584.
