= William Reynolds Ricketts =

American philatelist (1869–1956)

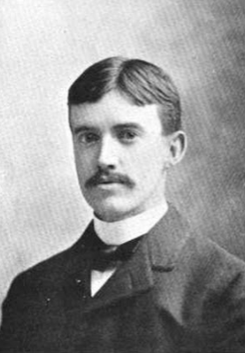
- Born: July 29, 1869
- Died: October 14, 1956 (aged 87)
- Engineering career
- Institutions: Collectors Club of New York
- Projects: Student and indexer of philatelic literature; created one of the largest indexes and libraries of such literature in his time
- Awards: APS Hall of Fame

William Reynolds Ricketts (July 29, 1869 – October 14, 1956), of Forty Fort, Pennsylvania, was a philatelist who created the largest index of philatelic literature available during his lifetime. He was considered the "greatest philatelic indexer of all time." Ricketts was the son of R. Bruce Ricketts and Elizabeth Reynolds Ricketts, for whom Ricketts Glen State Park in Pennsylvania is named.

== Collecting interests ==
Ricketts was primarily interested in philatelic literature and created two indexes: one for postage stamps, the other for philatelic literature. As part of his effort, he amassed one of the largest philatelic libraries in existence. In addition to collecting and indexing, Ricketts also wrote and published numerous articles on stamps and stamp collecting.

Indexes created by Ricketts were published, usually in small segments, in philatelic journals. However, his index was so huge that only a portion of his total index was ever published during his lifetime.

== Philatelic activity ==
Ricketts was a member of the Collectors Club of New York to which he donated a large portion of the foreign language philatelic literature of his library. The American Philatelic Society started to publish his index, but eventually stopped because of its size, whereupon Ricketts discontinued work on the index.

== Honors and awards ==
Ricketts signed the Roll of Distinguished Philatelists in 1921 and was named to the American Philatelic Society Hall of Fame in 1988.

== Legacy ==
The largest portion of his library was purchased by George Townsend Turner who, in turn, donated most of it to the Smithsonian Institution, where it is now located in the National Postal Museum at Washington, D.C.

== See also ==
- Philately
- Philatelic literature
