= George Ricketts (footballer) =

Australian rules footballer

Personal information
- Full name: George Ricketts
- Born: 13 December 1888; Geelong, Victoria
- Died: 27 February 1934 (aged 45); Geelong, Victoria
- Original team: Barwon

Playing career^{1}
Years	Club	Games (Goals)
1910	Geelong	3 (0)
- ^{1} Playing statistics correct to the end of 1910.

George Ricketts (13 December 1888 – 27 February 1934) was an Australian rules footballer who played with Geelong in the Victorian Football League (VFL).
