= Henry Lott Brook =

River in Pennsylvania, United States

Physical characteristics
- Source
  - location: South Mountain in Forkston Township, Wyoming County, Pennsylvania
  - elevation: 2,097 feet (639 m)
- Mouth
  - location: Mehoopany Creek in Forkston Township, Wyoming County, Pennsylvania at Kasson Brook
  - coordinates: 41°27′57″N 76°09′30″W
  - elevation: 1,070 feet (330 m)
- Length: 2.4 mi (3.9 km)
- Basin size: 2.68 mi^{2} (6.9 km^{2})

Basin features
- Progression: Mehoopany Creek → Susquehanna River → Chesapeake Bay

Henry Lott Brook is a tributary of Mehoopany Creek in Wyoming County, Pennsylvania, in the United States. It is approximately 2.4 miles (3.9 km) long and flows through Forkston Township. The watershed of the stream has an area of 2.68 square miles (6.9 km^{2}). The stream is not designated as an impaired waterbody and it is classified as a High-Quality Coldwater Fishery. It is one of five large tributaries of Mehoopany Creek to cut through the Mehoopany Creek-Bowman Creek watershed divide.

== Course ==
Henry Lott Brook begins on South Mountain in Forkston Township. It flows in a roughly northerly direction for several tenths of a mile, entering a valley. The stream then turns north-northwest for more than a mile before turning north and reaching the end of its valley. It then reaches its confluence with Mehoopany Creek.

Henry Lott Brook joins Mehoopany Creek 12.02 miles (19.34 km) upstream of its mouth.

== Geography, geology, and hydrology ==
The elevation near the mouth of Henry Lott Brook is 1,070 feet (330 m) above sea level. The elevation near the stream's source is 2,097 feet (639 m) above sea level.

Henry Lott Brook is one of five large brooks to descend from a high, flat-topped mountain that separates the Mehoopany Creek watershed from the Bowman Creek watershed. An especially high summit begins at Henry Lott Brook and runs past the headwaters of Somer Brook and South Brook. There are rapids on Mehoopany Creek both upstream and downstream of the point where Henry Lott Brook joins the creek. A cascade is located at the confluence of the two streams.

Coal deposits were rumored to be present at the headwaters of Henry Lott Brook in the late 1800s.

Henry Lott Brook is not designated as an impaired waterbody.

== Watershed and biology ==
The watershed of Henry Lott Brook has an area of 2.68 square miles (6.9 km^{2}). The stream is entirely within the United States Geological Survey quadrangle of Dutch Mountain. Its mouth is located at Kasson Brook.

Wild trout naturally reproduce in Henry Lott Brook from its headwaters downstream to its mouth. The stream is classified as a High-Quality Coldwater Fishery. Its designated use is for aquatic life.

== History ==
Henry Lott Brook was entered into the Geographic Names Information System on August 2, 1979. Its identifier in the Geographic Names Information System is 1198871.

Henry Lott Brook was given its designation as a wild trout stream in 2013. This designation does not affect the way the stream is managed. In April 2017, the stream was the upstream limit of trout stocking on Mehoopany Creek.

== See also ==
- Kasson Brook, next tributary of Mehoopany Creek going downstream
- Stony Brook (Mehoopany Creek), next tributary of Mehoopany Creek going upstream
- List of rivers of Pennsylvania
