= Kasson Brook =

River in Pennsylvania, United States

Kasson Brook Cassan Brook

Physical characteristics
- Source
  - location: South Mountain in Forkston Township, Wyoming County, Pennsylvania
  - elevation: 2,043 feet (623 m)
- Mouth
  - location: Mehoopany Creek in Forkston Township, Wyoming County, Pennsylvania at Kasson Brook
  - coordinates: 41°28′36″N 76°08′25″W
  - elevation: 997 feet (304 m)
- Length: 2.7 mi (4.3 km)
- Basin size: 4.53 mi^{2} (11.7 km^{2})

Basin features
- Progression: Mehoopany Creek → Susquehanna River → Chesapeake Bay

Kasson Brook (also known as Cassan Brook) is a tributary of Mehoopany Creek in Wyoming County, Pennsylvania, in the United States. It is approximately 2.7 miles (4.3 km) long and flows through Forkston Township. The watershed of the stream has an area of 4.53 square miles (11.7 km^{2}). The stream is not designated as an impaired waterbody and is classified as a High-Quality Coldwater Fishery. It is one of several streams to cut through South Mountain.

== Course ==
Kasson Brook begins on South Mountain in Forkston Township. It flows north-northwest for several tenths of a mile, entering a deep valley. The stream then turns west for a few tenths of a mile before turning north-northwest for more than a mile. It then exits its valley, crosses Windy Valley Road, and reaches its confluence with Mehoopany Creek.

Kasson Brook joins Mehoopany Creek 10.78 miles (17.35 km) upstream of its mouth.

== Geography and geology ==
The elevation near the mouth of Kasson Brook is 997 feet (304 m) above sea level. The elevation near the stream's source is 2,043 feet (623 m) above sea level.

Kasson Brook is one of five large brooks to divide a large, flat-topped mountain along Mehoopany Creek. Coal smut was also reported at a site at the stream's headwaters in the late 1800s.

Since 2000, a streambank stabilization project has been done on Kasson Brook. Some stream redirection has been done in the vicinity of Kasson Brook's confluence with Mehoopany Creek. This has been controversial among locals, who say that the geographical alterations cause flooding on their property.

== Hydrology and watershed ==
The watershed of Kasson Brook has an area of 4.53 square miles (11.7 km^{2}). The mouth of the stream is in the United States Geological Survey quadrangle of Dutch Mountain. However, its source is in the quadrangle of Noxen. The stream joins Mehoopany Creek at the village of Kasson Brook.

Kasson Brook is not designated as an impaired waterbody.

== History and recreation ==
Kasson Brook was entered into the Geographic Names Information System on August 2, 1979. Its identifier in the Geographic Names Information System is 1198961. The stream is also known as Cassan Brook.

At one point, the Civilian Conservation Corp had a camp on Kasson Brook. A concrete tee beam bridge carrying State Route 3001 over Kasson Brook was built in Forkston Township in 1953. It is 36.1 feet (11.0 m) long and is used by an average of 153 vehicles per day. In March 2016, the Pennsylvania Department of Environmental Protection collected samples from the stream in response to a request to re-evaluate these streams, as the streams in the Mehoopany Creek watershed had not been assessed in several years.

Pennsylvania State Game Lands are in the vicinity of Kasson Brook. The stream was given its designation as a wild trout stream in 2013. This designation does not affect the way the stream is managed.

== Biology ==
Wild trout naturally reproduce in Kasson Brook from its headwaters downstream to its mouth. The stream is classified as a High-Quality Coldwater Fishery. Its designated use is for aquatic life.

The mouth of Kasson Brook is the uppermost limit of trout stocking on Mehoopany Creek.

== See also ==
- Scouten Brook, next tributary of Mehoopany Creek going downstream
- Henry Lott Brook, next tributary of Mehoopany Creek going upstream
- List of rivers of Pennsylvania
