= Bellas Brook =

River in Pennsylvania, United States

Bellas Brook Hiller Brook

Physical characteristics
- Source
  - location: unnamed pond in Forkston Township, Wyoming County, Pennsylvania
  - elevation: 2,101 feet (640 m)
- Mouth
  - location: Mehoopany Creek in Forkston Township, Wyoming County, Pennsylvania near Bellasylva
  - coordinates: 41°24′51″N 76°14′11″W
  - elevation: 1,722 feet (525 m)
- Length: 2.3 mi (3.7 km)
- Basin size: 2.71 mi^{2} (7.0 km^{2})

Basin features
- Progression: Mehoopany Creek → Susquehanna River → Chesapeake Bay
- Tributaries
  - left: one unnamed tributary

Bellas Brook (also known as Hiller Brook) is a tributary of Mehoopany Creek in Wyoming County, Pennsylvania, in the United States. It is approximately 2.3 miles (3.7 km) long and flows through Forkston Township. The watershed of the stream has an area of 2.71 square miles (7.0 km^{2}). The stream is not designated as an impaired waterbody and is classified as a High-Quality Coldwater Fishery.

== Course ==
Bellas Brook begins in an unnamed pond in Forkston Township. It flows northwest though a wetland for a few tenths of a mile before turning north-northeast for several tenths of a mile. The stream then passes through another unnamed pond and turns north-northwest for a few tenths of a mile before turning north-northeast and entering a valley. After a few tenths of a mile, it turns northeast for several tenths of a mile, receiving an unnamed tributary from the left before reaching its confluence with Mehoopany Creek.

Bellas Brook joins Mehoopany Creek 18.40 miles (29.61 km) upstream of its mouth.

== Hydrology, geography, and geology ==
The elevation near the mouth of Bellas Brook is 1,722 feet (525 m) above sea level. The elevation near the stream's source is 2,101 feet (640 m) above sea level. Bellas Brook is a small and secluded stream.

Bellas Brook is not designated as an impaired waterbody.

== Watershed and biology ==
The watershed of Bellas Brook has an area of 2.71 square miles (7.0 km^{2}). The stream is entirely within the United States Geological Survey quadrangle of Dutch Mountain. Its mouth is located near Bellasylva. The stream's designated use is for aquatic life.

Bellas Brook is classified as a High-Quality Coldwater Fishery. In 1986, the stream was described as having a good population of native trout.

A swamp known as the Bellas Brook Swamp is located near the headwaters of Bellas Brook and is listed on the Wyoming County Natural Areas Inventory. This swamp is a spruce-hemlock swamp. In 1995, two small sub-populations of a plant that is rare in Pennsylvania were found in the swamp under red spruce trees.

== History and recreation ==
Bellas Brook was entered into the Geographic Names Information System on August 2, 1979. Its identifier in the Geographic Names Information System is 1198409. The stream is also known as Hiller Brook. This variant name appears in some United States Geological Survey maps.

Bellas Brook Swamp is located within Pennsylvania State Game Lands Number 57.

== See also ==
- South Brook (Mehoopany Creek), next tributary of Mehoopany Creek going downstream
- Cherry Ridge Run, next tributary of Mehoopany Creek going upstream
- List of rivers of Pennsylvania
