= Cherry Ridge Run =

Stream in Pennsylvania, United States

Bellas Brook

Physical characteristics
- Source
  - location: plateau pond in Fairmount Township, Luzerne County, Pennsylvania
  - elevation: 2,151 feet (656 m)
- Mouth
  - location: Mehoopany Creek in Forkston Township, Wyoming County, Pennsylvania at Ricketts
  - coordinates: 41°23′29″N 76°16′31″W
  - elevation: 2,037 feet (621 m)
- Length: 1.6 mi (2.6 km)
- Basin size: 1.66 sq mi (4.3 km^{2})

Basin features
- Progression: Mehoopany Creek → Susquehanna River → Chesapeake Bay
- Tributaries
  - left: one unnamed tributary
  - right: two unnamed tributaries

Cherry Ridge Run is a tributary of Mehoopany Creek in Luzerne County and Wyoming County, in Pennsylvania, in the United States. It is approximately 1.6 miles (2.6 km) long and flows through Fairmount Township in Luzerne County and Forkston Township in Wyoming County. The watershed of the stream has an area of 1.66 square miles (4.3 km^{2}). The stream is not designated as an impaired waterbody and has a 16 acres (6.5 ha) pond known as Wild Fowl Pond.

== Course ==
Cherry Ridge Run begins on a plateau in Fairmount Township, Luzerne County, near the drainage divide between Mehoopany Creek and Bowman Creek. It flows northwest for a few tenths of a mile through a wetland, where it receives an unnamed tributary from the right. The stream then enters Forkston Township, Wyoming County and turns north-northwest, entering another wetland, where it receives an unnamed tributary from the left and one from the right. Several tenths of a mile further downstream, it enters another wetland and Wild Fowl Pond. It then turns northwest for a few tenths of a mile, gradually curving west, before reaching its confluence with Mehoopany Creek.

Cherry Ridge Run joins Mehoopany Creek 23.06 miles (37.11 km) upstream of its mouth.

== Geography and geology ==
The elevation near the mouth of Cherry Ridge Run is 2,037 feet (621 m) above sea level. The elevation near the stream's source is 2,151 feet (656 m) above sea level. A 16 acres (6.5 ha) known as Wild Fowl Pond is located on the stream. This pond is very close to Pennsylvania Route 487.

== Hydrology, watershed, and biology ==
The watershed of Cherry Ridge Run has an area of 1.66 square miles (4.3 km^{2}). The mouth of the stream is in the United States Geological Survey quadrangle of Lopez. However, its source is in the quadrangle of Red Rock. The stream joins Mehoopany Creek at Ricketts. Its designated use is for aquatic life.

Cherry Ridge Run is not designated as an impaired waterbody. As of 2011, it is one of five named streams in the Mehoopany Creek watershed that have not been assessed by the Pennsylvania Fish and Boat Commission.

A pair of adult bald eagles have been observed at Wild Fowl Pond on Cherry Ridge Run, as well as four hooded mergansers and eight buffleheads.

== History ==
Cherry Ridge Run was entered into the Geographic Names Information System on August 2, 1979. Its identifier in the Geographic Names Information System is 1198561.

== See also ==
- Bellas Brook, next tributary of Mehoopany Creek going downstream
- List of rivers of Pennsylvania
