= Rogers Hollow =

River in the United States of America

- Etymology: the valley through which the stream flows

Physical characteristics
- Source
  - location: broad valley next to Mehoopany Mountain and Doll Mountain in Forkston Township, Wyoming County, Pennsylvania
  - elevation: 1,253 feet (382 m)
- Mouth
  - location: Mehoopany Creek in Forkston Township, Wyoming County, Pennsylvania near Forkston
  - coordinates: 41°32′51″N 76°05′51″W
  - elevation: 712 feet (217 m)
- Length: 2.2 mi (3.5 km)

Basin features
- Progression: Mehoopany Creek → Susquehanna River → Chesapeake Bay

Rogers Hollow is a tributary of Mehoopany Creek in Wyoming County, Pennsylvania, in the United States. It is approximately 2.2 miles (3.5 km) long and flows through Mehoopany Township. The watershed of the creek has an area of 2.44 square miles (6.3 km^{2}). The creek is classified as a Coldwater Fishery and is in the vicinity of Mehoopany Mountain and Doll Mountain.

== Course ==
Rogers Hollow begins in a broad valley next to Mehoopany Mountain and Doll Mountain in Forkston Township. It flows northwest for a short distance before turning north-northwest for a few tenths of a mile. It then turns west-northwest for more than a mile, reaching the end of its valley and crossing Pennsylvania Route 87. The stream then turns west-northwest along the base of Mehoopany Mountain, gradually turning north-northwest over the next few tenths of a mile before reaching its confluence with Mehoopany Creek.

Rogers Hollow is approximately 2.2 miles (3.5 km) long. The stream joins Mehoopany Creek 4.58 miles (7.37 km) upstream of its mouth.

== Geography and geology ==
The elevation near the mouth of Rogers Hollow is 712 feet (217 m) above sea level, while the elevation near the mouth of the valley is 728 feet (222 m) above sea level. The elevation near the creek's source is 1,253 feet (382 m) above sea level.

The valley of Rogers Hollow is relatively broad for its length. The mountains that border it on three sides form a U-shaped boundary.

== Watershed and biology ==
The watershed of Rogers Hollow has an area of 2.44 square miles (6.3 km^{2}). The stream is entirely within the United States Geological Survey quadrangle of Meshoppen. Its mouth is located near Forkston.

The entirety of Rogers Hollow is classified as a Coldwater Fishery. It is one of only three named direct tributaries of Mehoopany Creek to have this classification.

== History ==
The valley of Rogers Hollow was entered into the Geographic Names Information System on August 2, 1979. Its identifier in the Geographic Names Information System is 1185392. The stream does not have a name of its own, but instead takes the name of the valley through which it flows.

Appalachia Midstream Services, LLC. has been issued an Erosion and Sediment Control permit for which one of the receiving waterbodies is Rogers Hollow.

In 2015 and in 2016, Rogers Hollow served as the downstream boundary for stocking of brook trout and brown trout on Mehoopany Creek.

== See also ==
- Fox Hollow (Mehoopany Creek), next tributary of Mehoopany Creek going downstream
- North Branch Mehoopany Creek, next tributary of Mehoopany Creek going upstream
- List of rivers of Pennsylvania
