= Opossum Brook =

River in Pennsylvania, US

Physical characteristics
- Source
  - location: unnamed pond in Ross Township, Luzerne County, Pennsylvania
  - elevation: 2,136 feet (651 m)
- Mouth
  - location: Mehoopany Creek in Forkston Township, Wyoming County, Pennsylvania near Bellasylva
  - coordinates: 41°25′14″N 76°12′55″W
  - elevation: 1,555 feet (474 m)
- Length: 4.0 mi (6.4 km)
- Basin size: 5.13 sq mi (13.3 km^{2})

Basin features
- Progression: South Brook → Mehoopany Creek → Susquehanna River → Chesapeake Bay
- Tributaries
  - left: two unnamed tributaries
  - right: two unnamed tributaries

Opossum Brook is a tributary of South Brook in Luzerne County and Wyoming County, in Pennsylvania, United States. It is approximately 4.0 miles (6.4 km) long and flows through Ross Township in Luzerne County and Forkston Township in Wyoming County. The watershed of the stream has an area of 5.13 square miles (13.3 km^{2}). The stream is classified as a High-Quality Coldwater Fishery and has wild trout. The stream has a number of wetlands in its watershed and in some areas is good for birdwatching.

== Course ==
Opossum Brook begins in an unnamed pond in Ross Township, Luzerne County. It flows north for a few tenths of a mile before turning northwest, entering Forkston Township, Wyoming County, passing through another unnamed pond, and entering a large wetland. Here the stream receives an unnamed tributary from the left and turns northeast for several tenths of a mile before receiving another unnamed tributary from the left and one from the right. It then leaves the wetland and turns north, entering a valley. After more than a mile, the stream turns north-northwest for a few tenths of a mile, passing through another wetland before turning northeast. After several tenths of a mile, it receives another unnamed tributary from the right and turns north for a few tenths of a mile. The stream then turns northeast for several tenths of a mile before reaching its confluence with South Brook.

Opossum Brook joins South Brook 0.18 miles (0.29 km) upstream of its mouth.

== Hydrology, geography, and geology ==
The elevation near the mouth of Opossum Brook is 1,555 feet (474 m) above sea level. The elevation near the source of the stream is 2,136 feet (651 m) above sea level. The stream flows in a generally northerly direction.

Opossum Brook is not designated as an impaired waterbody. The stream's water has a dark tinge due to tannin content from the wetlands in its watershed.

== Watershed and biology ==
The watershed of Opossum Brook has an area of 5.13 square miles (13.3 km^{2}). The mouth of the stream is in the United States Geological Survey quadrangle of Dutch Mountain. However, its source is in the quadrangle of Sweet Valley. The stream joins South Brook near Bellasylva. Opossum Brook's designated use is for aquatic life.

There are wetlands in the watershed of Opossum Brook, including some downstream of Opossum Brook Road.

Opossum Brook is classified as a High-Quality Coldwater Fishery. Wild trout naturally reproduce in Opossum Brook from its headwaters downstream to its mouth. The point where Opossum Brook Road crosses the stream has been described as an ideal place for birdwatching. The state-endangered blackpoll warbler has been observed in the Opossum Brook wetlands.

== History and recreation ==
Opossum Brook was entered into the Geographic Names Information System on August 2, 1979. Its identifier in the Geographic Names Information System is 1199254.

Historically, a railroad ran down Opossum Brook to aid companies such as T & T and the Central Pennsylvania Lumber Company in transporting wood logged in the Mehoopany Creek watershed. In 1929, Ralph Davis discovered signs of beavers on the stream while traveling from Rickett's Station to his camp in Hell's Kitchen. This led to an annual beaver harvest in Pennsylvania State Game Lands Number 57 that continued until at least the late 1940s. An unpaved road known as Opossum Brook Road crosses Opossum Brook. This road is noted in Jeff Mitchell's book Hiking the Endless Mountains as being a hiking route to Sprankles Pond.

== See also ==
- List of rivers of Pennsylvania
