= Fox Hollow =

Fox Hollow may refer to:

- Fox Hollow, Indiana
- Fox Hollow (Oregon County, Missouri)
- Fox Hollow (Rensselaer County, New York)
- Fox Hollow (Mehoopany Creek), a stream in Wyoming County, Pennsylvania
- Fox Hollow, Virginia
- Foxhollow, Wisconsin
- Fox Hollow School, Lenox, Massachusetts
