= Scouten Brook =

River in Pennsylvania, United States

Physical characteristics
- Source
  - location: South Mountain in Forkston Township, Wyoming County, Pennsylvania
  - elevation: 2,192 feet (668 m)
- Mouth
  - location: Mehoopany Creek in Forkston Township, Wyoming County, Pennsylvania at Kasson Brook
  - coordinates: 41°29′06″N 76°08′06″W
  - elevation: 948 feet (289 m)
- Length: 2.2 mi (3.5 km)
- Basin size: 2.66 mi^{2} (6.9 km^{2})

Basin features
- Progression: Mehoopany Creek → Susquehanna River → Chesapeake Bay
- Tributaries
  - right: one unnamed tributary

Scouten Brook is a tributary of Mehoopany Creek in Wyoming County, Pennsylvania, in the United States. It is approximately 2.2 miles (3.5 km) long and flows through Forkston Township. The watershed of the stream has an area of 2.66 square miles (6.9 km^{2}). The stream is designated as a High-Quality Coldwater Fishery and has wild trout. It is one of five large brooks to cut through South Mountain.

== Course ==
Scouten Brook begins on South Mountain in Forkston Township. It flows north-northwest for several tenths of a mile before entering a valley and turning northwest for about a mile. The stream then receives an unnamed tributary from the right and turns west-northwest for several tenths of a mile. It then turns west for several tenths of a mile, leaving its valley, crossing Windy Valley Road, and reaching its confluence with Mehoopany Creek.

Scouten Brook joins Mehoopany Creek 10.14 miles (16.32 km) upstream of its mouth.

== Geography and geology ==
The elevation near the mouth of Scouten Brook is 948 feet (289 m) above sea level. The elevation near the stream's source is 2,192 feet (668 m) above sea level.

Scouten Brook is one of five large brooks to divide a large, flat-topped mountain along Mehoopany Creek. This mountain is known as South Mountain and Scouten Brook is the furthest downstream of the five streams. Forkston Mountain is also situated near the stream. In the late 1800s, coal smut was reported at a tract at the headwaters of Scouten Brook.

== Watershed and biology ==
The watershed of Scouten Brook has an area of 2.66 square miles (6.9 km^{2}). The mouth of the stream is in the United States Geological Survey quadrangle of Dutch Mountain. However, its source is in the quadrangle of Noxen. The mouth of the stream is located at Kasson Brook and is 2 miles (3.2 km) south of Forkston.

Wild trout naturally reproduce in Scouten Brook from its headwaters downstream to its mouth. The stream is classified as a High-Quality Coldwater Fishery.

== History ==
Scouten Brook was entered into the Geographic Names Information System on August 2, 1979. Its identifier in the Geographic Names Information System is 1199963.

Since 2000, a streambank stabilization project has been done on Scouten Brook.

== See also ==
- White Brook, next tributary of Mehoopany Creek going downstream
- Kasson Brook, next tributary of Mehoopany Creek going upstream
- List of rivers of Pennsylvania
