= Becker Brook =

Tributary of Mehoopany Creek in Pennsylvania, US

Physical characteristics
- Source
  - location: Dutch Mountain in Forkston Township, Wyoming County, Pennsylvania
  - elevation: 2,185 feet (666 m)
- Mouth
  - location: Mehoopany Creek in Forkston Township, Wyoming County, Pennsylvania near Bellasylva
  - coordinates: 41°26′56″N 76°11′14″W
  - elevation: 1,250 feet (380 m)
- Length: 2.6 mi (4.2 km)
- Basin size: 2.33 sq mi (6.0 km^{2})

Basin features
- Progression: Mehoopany Creek → Susquehanna River → Chesapeake Bay
- Tributaries
  - left: one unnamed tributary
  - right: one unnamed tributary

Becker Brook is a tributary of Mehoopany Creek in Wyoming County, Pennsylvania, in the United States. It is approximately 2.6 miles (4.2 km) long and flows through Forkston Township. The watershed of the stream has an area of 2.33 square miles (6.0 km^{2}). The stream is designated as a High-Quality Coldwater Fishery. It is small and secluded, with a swamp known as the Becker Brook Swamp at its headwaters.

== Course ==
Becker Brook begins on Dutch Mountain in Forkston Township. It flows south for several tenths of a mile before turning east for a few tenths of a mile and then turning southeast. After several tenths of a mile, the stream enters a valley and receives an unnamed tributary from the right. It then turns east-southeast for several tenths of a mile before receiving an unnamed tributary from the left. The stream then turns southeast for a few tenths of its mile before turning east-southeast. A few tenths of a mile further downstream, it leaves its valley and meanders to its confluence with Mehoopany Creek.

Becker Brook joins Mehoopany Creek 14.20 miles (22.85 km) upstream of its mouth.

== Geography and geology ==
The elevation near the mouth of Becker Brook is 1,250 feet (380 m) above sea level. The elevation near the stream's source is 2,185 feet (666 m) above sea level.

Becker Brook is a small and secluded stream. It flows in a generally easterly direction.

== Hydrology and watershed ==
The watershed of Becker Brook has an area of 2.33 square miles (6.0 km^{2}). The stream is entirely within the United States Geological Survey quadrangle of Dutch Mountain. Its mouth is located near Bellasylva. The designated use of the stream is for aquatic life.

Becker Brook is not designated as an impaired waterbody.

== History and recreation ==
Becker Brook was entered into the Geographic Names Information System on August 2, 1979. Its identifier in the Geographic Names Information System is 1198395.

Becker Brook is located in Pennsylvania State Game Lands Number 57.

== Biology ==
Becker Brook is classified as a High-Quality Coldwater Fishery. In 1986, the stream was noted to have a good population of native trout. Yellow-bellied flycatchers have been observed nesting at the headwaters of Becker Brook. Other bird species inhabiting the Becker Brook Swamp include black-throated blue warblers, dark-eyed juncos, and white-throated sparrows.

A site known as the Becker Brook Swamp is listed on the Wyoming County Natural Areas Inventory and at the headwaters of Becker Brook. Major environmental threats to this site include beaver activity, logging, and ATV usage. The Wyoming County Natural Areas Inventory recommended protecting the swamp and surrounding areas from ATV usage. Dominant plant species in the swamp include red spruce, red maple, dense thickets of highbush blueberry, cinnamon fern, and sphagnum moss.

== See also ==
- Somer Brook, next tributary of Mehoopany Creek going downstream
- South Brook (Mehoopany Creek), next tributary of Mehoopany Creek going upstream
- List of rivers of Pennsylvania
