= South Brook (Mehoopany Creek tributary) =

River in Pennsylvania, United States

Physical characteristics
- Source
  - location: wetland in Ross Township, Luzerne County, Pennsylvania
  - elevation: 2,211 feet (674 m)
- Mouth
  - location: Mehoopany Creek in Forkston Township, Wyoming County, Pennsylvania near Bellasylva
  - coordinates: 41°25′22″N 76°12′54″W
  - elevation: 1,532 feet (467 m)
- Length: 6.0 mi (9.7 km)
- Basin size: 10.1 mi^{2} (26 km^{2})

Basin features
- Progression: Mehoopany Creek → Susquehanna River → Chesapeake Bay
- Tributaries
  - left: Opossum Brook

South Brook is a tributary of Mehoopany Creek in Luzerne County and Wyoming County, in Pennsylvania, in the United States. It is approximately 6.0 miles (9.7 km) long and flows through Ross Township and Lake Township, Luzerne County, Pennsylvania in Luzerne County and Forkston Township in Wyoming County. The watershed of the stream has an area of 10.1 square miles (26 km^{2}). Wild trout are present in the stream and it has one named tributary, which is known as Opossum Brook.

== Course ==
South Brook begins in a wetland in Ross Township, Luzerne County. It flows northeast for several tenths of a mile and briefly enters Forkston Township, Wyoming County before turning south-southeast and reentering Ross Township, Luzerne County. The stream passes through a small unnamed pond and turns east, entering another wetland. Upon leaving this wetland, it enters Lake Township, Luzerne County and turns northeast for a few tenths of a mile before entering a third wetland. The stream then reenters Forkston Township, Wyoming County and meanders north through three more wetlands. It then turns northwest for a few miles, entering a deep valley. After more than a mile, its valley broadens and it continues flowing northwest for several tenths of a mile before receiving the tributary Opossum Brook from the left. The stream then turns north for a few tenths of a mile before reaching its confluence with Mehoopany Creek.

South Brook joins Mehoopany Creek 16.94 miles (27.26 km) upstream of its mouth.

=== Tributaries ===
South Brook has one named tributary, which is known as Opossum Brook. Opossum Brook joins South Brook 0.18 miles (0.29 km) upstream of its mouth, near Bellasylva, and drains an area of 5.13 square miles (13.3 km^{2}).

== Geography and geology ==
The elevation near the mouth of South Brook is 1,532 feet (467 m) above sea level. The elevation near the stream's source is 2,211 feet (674 m) above sea level. South Brook is a small and secluded stream. It flows in a generally northwesterly direction.

South Brook is one of five large brooks to descend from a high, flat-topped mountain that separates the Mehoopany Creek watershed from the Bowman Creek watershed. Going from southwest to northeast, South Brook is the first of these brooks. An especially high summit of the mountain runs from the headwaters of the stream to the headwaters of Henry Lott Brook.

In the late 1800s, coal was reported to appear at the headwaters of South Brook. The stream was described a s a "cold, clear mountain stream" in the late 1940s.

== Watershed ==
The watershed of South Brook has an area of 10.1 square miles (26 km^{2}). The mouth of the stream is in the United States Geological Survey quadrangle of Dutch Mountain. However, its source is in the quadrangle of Sweet Valley. The stream joins Mehoopany Creek near Bellasylva.

There are some Pennsylvania Game Commission roads in the watershed of South Brook.

== History and recreation ==
South Brook was entered into the Geographic Names Information System on August 2, 1979. Its identifier in the Geographic Names Information System is 1199981.

South Brook has been in Pennsylvania State Game Lands Number 57 since at least the late 1940s. It has also been noted for its trout fishing opportunities for a similar length of time.

== Biology ==
Wild trout naturally reproduce in South Brook from its headwaters downstream to its mouth. The stream was noted to have a good wild trout population in the 1986 issue of the Pennsylvania Angler. The stream is classified as a High-Quality Coldwater Fishery.

== See also ==
- Becker Brook, next tributary of Mehoopany Creek going downstream
- Bellas Brook, next tributary of Mehoopany Creek going upstream
- List of rivers of Pennsylvania
