= Somer Brook =

River in Pennsylvania, United States

Somer Brook Somers Brook

Physical characteristics
- Source
  - location: wetland at the top of South Mountain in Noxen Township, Pennsylvania
  - elevation: 2,186 feet (666 m)
- Mouth
  - location: Mehoopany Creek in Forkston Township, Wyoming County, Pennsylvania near Kasson Brook
  - coordinates: 41°27′31″N 76°10′18″W
  - elevation: 1,142 feet (348 m)
- Length: 3.7 mi (6.0 km)
- Basin size: 4.48 mi^{2} (11.6 km^{2})

Basin features
- Progression: Mehoopany Creek → Susquehanna River → Chesapeake Bay

Somer Brook (also known as Somers Brook) is a tributary of Mehoopany Creek in Wyoming County, Pennsylvania, in the United States. It is approximately 3.7 miles (6.0 km) long and flows through Noxen Township and Forkston Township. The watershed of the stream has an area of 4.48 square miles (11.6 km^{2}). The stream is not designated as an impaired waterbody and is classified as a High-Quality Coldwater Fishery. Fauna that have been observed in the stream's vicinity include northern water shrews and trout.

== Course ==
Somer Brook begins in a wetland at the top of South Mountain in Noxen Township. It flows northwest for a short distance before turning southwest for a short distance and entering another wetland. Here, the stream turns north for a short distance before turning east-northeast for a few tenths of a mile and entering a third wetland. It then turns southwest before turning east-northeast for a few tenths of a mile and entering Forkston Township. Here, the stream enters a valley and turns north for a few tenths of a mile before gradually turning north-northeast for several tenths of a mile. It then turns north-northwest for several tenths of a mile before turning north. After several tenths of a mile, the stream reaches the end of its valley and reaches its confluence with Mehoopany Creek.

Somer Brook joins Mehoopany Creek 13.04 miles (20.99 km) upstream of its mouth.

== Hydrology ==
Somer Brook is not designated as an impaired waterbody.

In August 1995, Somer Brook received several water quality measurements. The water temperature ranged from 24.0 to 24.5 °C (75.2 to 76.1 °F), with an average of 24.2 °C (75.6 °F). The pH of the stream ranged from 5.0 to 5.1, with an average of 5.0, and the conductivity ranged from 3.3 to 3.5 uohms/cm with an average of 3.4. The total dissolved solids concentration was 20 parts per million at each of the three sites while, the concentration of dissolved oxygen ranged from 6.2 to 6.4 milligrams per liter (0.0062 to 0.0064 oz/cu ft), with an average of 6.3 milligrams per liter (0.0063 oz/cu ft).

== Geography and geology ==
The elevation near the mouth of Somer Brook is 1,142 feet (348 m) above sea level. The elevation near the stream's source is 2,186 feet (666 m) above sea level.

Somer Brook is one of five large brooks to descend from a high, flat-topped mountain that separates the Mehoopany Creek watershed from the Bowman Creek watershed. Going from southwest to northeast, Somer Brook is the second of these brooks.

In the late 1800s, coal deposits were rumored to occur at the headwaters of Somer Brook.

== Watershed ==
The watershed of Somer Brook has an area of 4.48 square miles (11.6 km^{2}). The stream is entirely within the United States Geological Survey quadrangle of Dutch Mountain. Its mouth is located at Kasson Brook. The designated use of the stream is for aquatic life.

== History and recreation ==
Somer Brook was entered into the Geographic Names Information System on August 2, 1979. Its identifier in the Geographic Names Information System is 1199559. The stream is also known as Somers Brook. This variant name appears on some United States Geological Survey topographic maps.

In March 2016, the Pennsylvania Department of Environmental Protection collected samples from Somer Brook in response to a request to re-evaluate these streams, as the streams in the Mehoopany Creek watershed had not been assessed in several years.

Somer Brook is described as "scenic" in Jeff Mitchell's book Hiking the Endless Mountains. There are numerous old forest roads suitable for hiking in the area.

== Biology ==
Wild trout naturally reproduce in Somer Brook from its headwaters downstream to its mouth. The stream is classified as a High-Quality Coldwater Fishery.

In 1995, northern water shrews were found at Somer Brook.

== See also ==
- Stony Brook (Mehoopany Creek), next tributary of Mehoopany Creek going downstream
- Becker Brook, next tributary of Mehoopany Creek going upstream
- List of rivers of Pennsylvania
