= White Brook =

River in Pennsylvania, United States

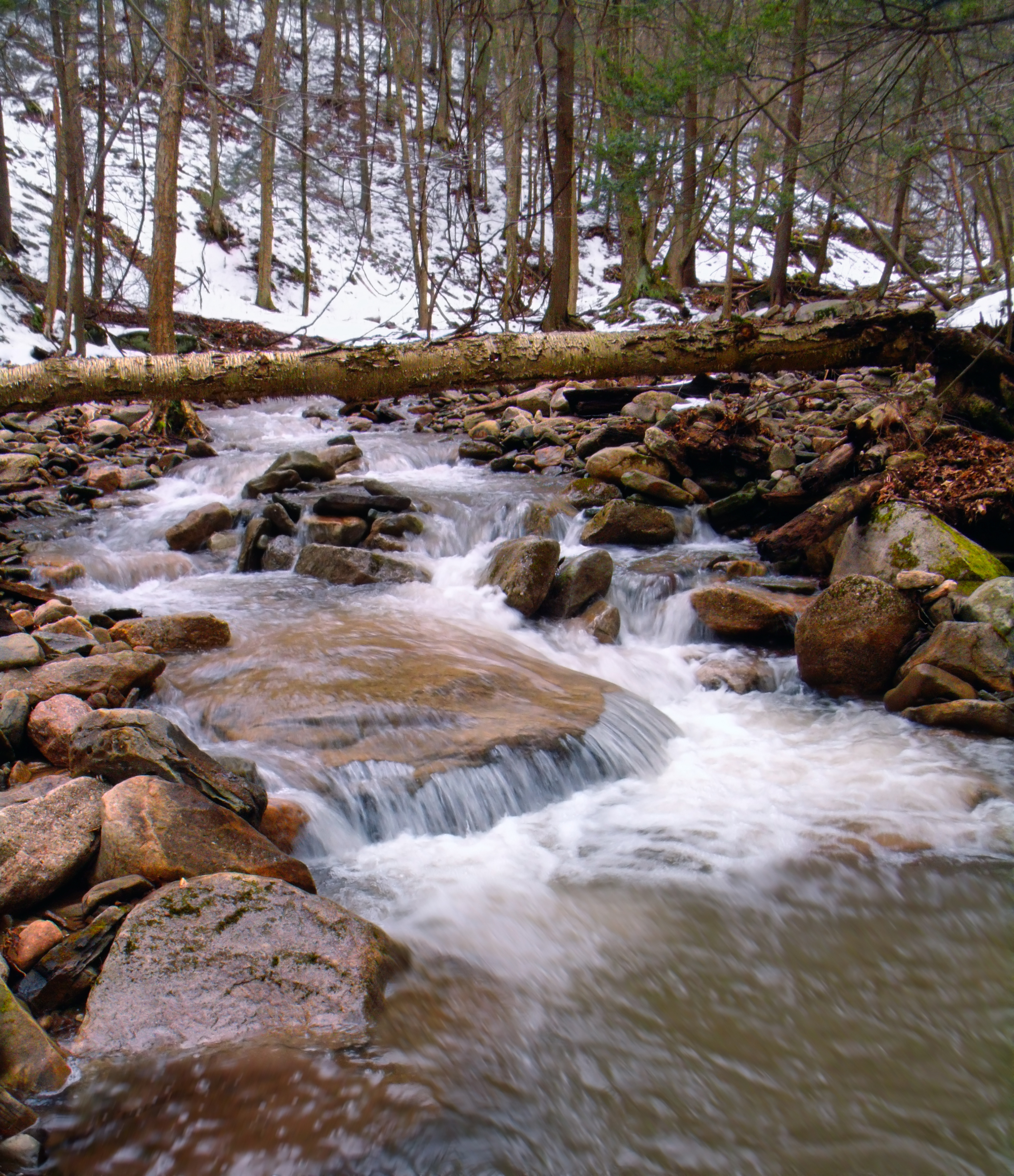
- White Brook in March 2011

Physical characteristics
- Source
  - location: near the edge of a plateau in North Branch Township, Pennsylvania
  - elevation: 2,043 feet (623 m)
- Mouth
  - location: Mehoopany Creek in Forkston Township, Wyoming County, Pennsylvania near Kasson Brook
  - coordinates: 41°29′55″N 76°07′47″W
  - elevation: 879 feet (268 m)
- Length: 1.8 miles (2.9 km)
- Basin size: 1.75 square miles (4.5 km^{2})

Basin features
- Progression: Mehoopany Creek → Susquehanna River → Chesapeake Bay
- Tributaries
  - right: one unnamed tributary

White Brook is a tributary of Mehoopany Creek in Wyoming County, Pennsylvania, in the United States. It is approximately 1.8 miles (2.9 km) long and flows through North Branch Township and Forkston Township, in Wyoming County, Pennsylvania, in the United States. The stream's watershed has an area of 1.75 square miles (4.5 km^{2}). The stream is classified as a High-Quality Coldwater Fishery. It has a small waterfall and a hiking path is located nearby.

== Course ==
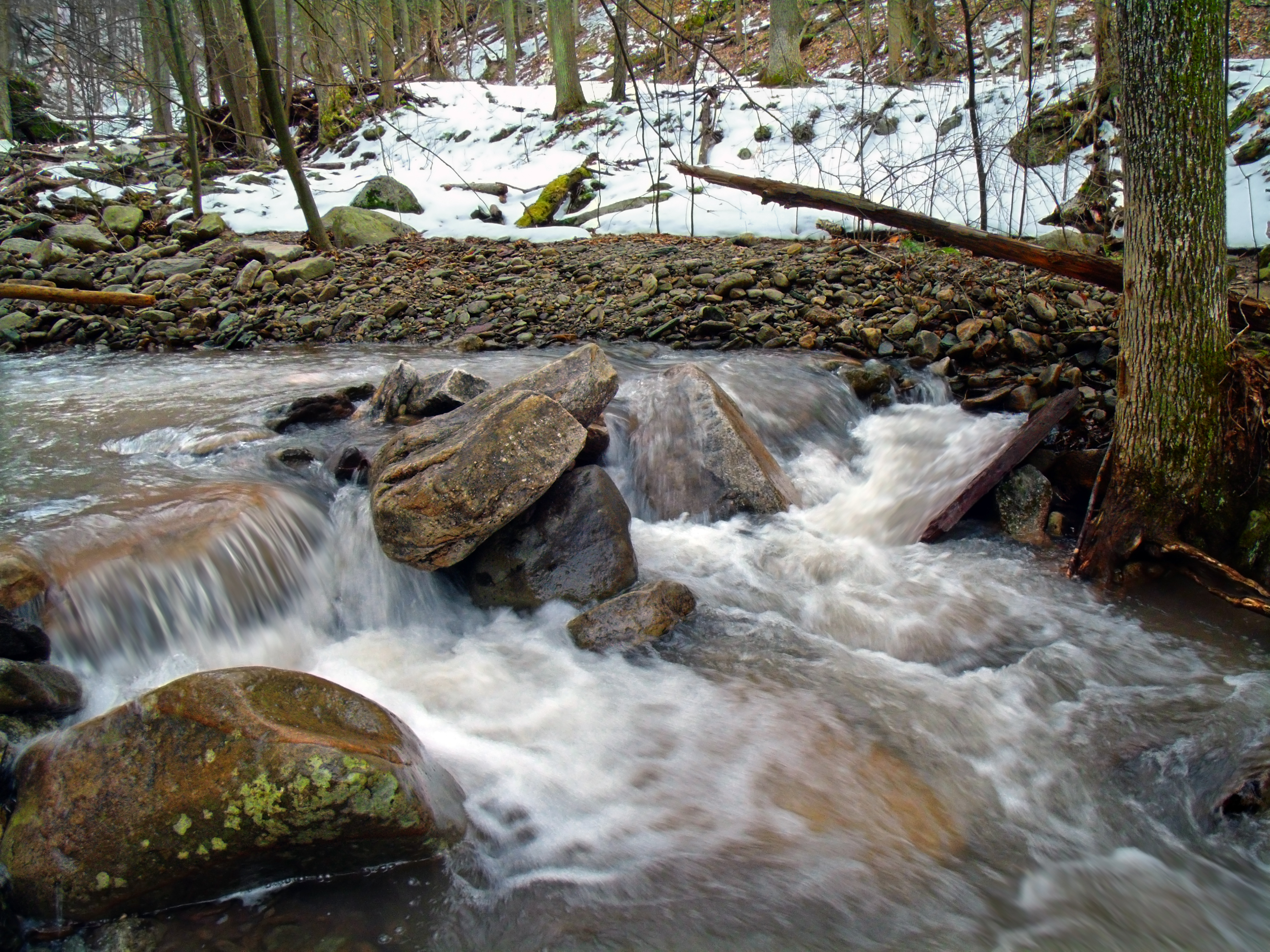
White Brook in March 2011

White Brook begins near the edge of a plateau in North Branch Township. It flows south-southwest for a few tenths of a mile, heading into a valley. The stream then turns south-southeast for several tenths of a mile before entering Forkston Township and reaching the valley floor, where it receives an unnamed tributary from the right. It then turns east-southeast for several tenths of a mile before turning east-northeast for several tenths of a mile and exiting the valley. Here, the stream flows east for several tenths of a mile in the Mehoopany Creek valley before reaching its confluence with Mehoopany Creek.

White Brook joins Mehoopany Creek 8.88 miles (14.29 km) upstream of its mouth.

== Geography and geology ==
The elevation near the mouth of White Brook is 879 feet (268 m) above sea level. The elevation near the source of the stream is 2,043 feet (623 m) above sea level.

There is a waterfall on White Brook. It is approximately 15 feet (4.6 m) high and is in a rugged glen with many cascades, ledges, boulders, and white cobbles. However, it is only accessible by bushwhacking.

One person has received an encroachment permit to build and maintain a 26-foot (7.9 m) private footbridge across White Brook near State Route 3001.

== Watershed and biology ==
The watershed on White Brook has an area of 1.75 square miles (4.5 km^{2}). The mouth of the stream is in the United States Geological Survey quadrangle of Dutch Mountain. However, its source is in the quadrangle of Jenningsville. The stream's mouth is located near Kasson Brook. There are a few cottages along the lower reaches of the stream.

White Brook is classified as a High-Quality Coldwater Fishery. Wild trout naturally reproduce in the stream from its headwaters downstream to its mouth.

== History and recreation ==
White Brook was entered into the Geographic Names Information System on August 2, 1979. Its identifier in the Geographic Names Information System is 1199780.

Since 2000, a streambank stabilization project has been done on White Brook.

White Brook is in Pennsylvania State Game Lands Number 57. An old, unmarked steep trail follows the stream up to a "beautiful" vista at Flat Top. Some all-terrain vehicle trails are present in the upper reaches of the stream's watershed. These are maintained via flagging and removal of brush and trees.

== See also ==
- Bowman Hollow, next tributary of Mehoopany Creek going downstream
- Scouten Brook, next tributary of Mehoopany Creek going upstream
- List of rivers of Pennsylvania
