= Fox Hollow (Mehoopany Creek) =

- Etymology: the valley through which the stream flows

Physical characteristics
- Source
  - location: swamp in Forkston Township, Wyoming County, Pennsylvania
  - elevation: 1,023 feet (312 m)
- Mouth
  - location: Mehoopany Creek in Forkston Township, Wyoming County, Pennsylvania near Forkston
  - coordinates: 41°33′17″N 76°06′05″W
  - elevation: 722 feet (220 m)
- Length: 0.8 mi (1.3 km)

Basin features
- Progression: Mehoopany Creek → Susquehanna River → Chesapeake Bay

Fox Hollow is a tributary of Mehoopany Creek in Wyoming County, Pennsylvania, in the United States. It is approximately 0.8 miles (1.3 km) long and flows through Mehoopany Township. The watershed of the stream has an area of 1.83 square miles (4.7 km^{2}). The Fox Hollow Swamp is listed on A Natural Areas Inventory of Wyoming County.

== Course ==
Fox Hollow begins to the south of Little Round Top in a large wetland that extends into Windham Township. It flows east for several hundred feet before turning southeast for a few tenths of a mile, entering a valley. The stream then turns south for several hundred feet before turning southeast again for a few tenths of a mile. It then turns east-southeast for several hundred feet before reaching its confluence with Mehoopany Creek.

Fox Hollow is approximately 0.8 miles (1.3 km) long. The stream joins Mehoopany Creek 4.09 miles (6.58 km) upstream of its mouth.

== Geography and geology ==
The elevation near the mouth of Fox Hollow is 722 feet (220 m) above sea level. The elevation near the source of Fox Hollow is 1,023 feet (312 m) above sea level.

Fox Hollow is located near a mountain known as Little Round Top.

== Watershed and biology ==
The watershed of Fox Hollow has an area of 1.83 square miles (4.7 km^{2}). The valley of the stream is entirely within the United States Geological Survey quadrangle of Forkston. Its mouth is located near Forkston.

Appalachia Midstream Services, LLC. has been issued an Erosion and Sediment Control permit for which one of the receiving streams is Fox Hollow.

The Fox Hollow Swamp in Windham Township is listed on the A Natural Areas Inventory of Wyoming County. It is a northern broadleaf conifer swamp in a location without many large wetlands and has the potential to serve as a habitat for rare species, though none were observed when the Inventory was compiled. The swamp has an area of 40 to 50 acres (16 to 20 ha) and originally consisted mainly of black ash, hemlock, and yellow birch. However, most of this was logged in the 1930s or later and was reforested. It contains windthrows, mossy hummocks, and some old hemlocks, as well as common local herbs. Sedges, golden ragwort, cinnamon fern, and swamp saxifrage are common in the swamp.

The entirety of Fox Hollow is classified as a Coldwater Fishery. It is one of only three named direct tributaries of Mehoopany Creek to have this classification.

== History ==
The valley of Fox Hollow was entered into the Geographic Names Information System on August 2, 1979. Its identifier in the Geographic Names Information System is 1175099. The stream is not officially named, but instead takes the name of the valley through which it flows.

Historically there was a one-room schoolhouse known as Fox Hollow in Windham Township. However, it was closed in 1919.

== See also ==
- Rogers Hollow, next tributary of Mehoopany Creek going upstream
- List of rivers of Pennsylvania
