= Little Mehoopany Creek =

Natural watercourse in Wyoming County, Pennsylvania, United States of America

Physical characteristics
- Source
  - location: Sharpe Pond in Windham Township, Wyoming County, Pennsylvania
  - elevation: 1,139 ft (347 m)
- Mouth
  - location: Susquehanna River in Mehoopany Township, Pennsylvania at North Mehoopany
  - coordinates: 41°34′36″N 76°03′35″W
  - elevation: 610 ft (190 m)
- Length: 8.4 mi (13.5 km)
- Basin size: 11.3 sq mi (29 km^{2})
- Width
  - average: 20 ft (6.1 m) (at outlet of Jennings Pond)
- Depth
  - average: 2 ft (0.61 m) (at outlet of Jennings Pond)

Basin features
- Progression: Susquehanna River → Chesapeake Bay
- Tributaries
  - right: one unnamed tributary

Little Mehoopany Creek is a tributary of the Susquehanna River in Wyoming County, Pennsylvania, in the United States. It is approximately 8.4 miles (13.5 km) long and flows through Windham Township and Mehoopany Township. The watershed of the creek has an area of 11.3 square miles (29 km^{2}), most of which is forested land and agricultural land. No stream in the watershed is designated as an impaired waterbody. The main rock formation in the watershed is the Catskill Formation and the main soil association is the Wellsboro-Oquaga-Morris.

There are four artificial lakes along Little Mehoopany Creek: Sharpe Pond, Negro Pond, Chamberlain Pond, and Jennings Pond, and numerous palustrine wetlands in the creek's watershed. A number of bridges have been built over the creek and the natural gas industry is active in the area. The watershed is designated as a Coldwater Fishery and a Migratory Fishery.

== Course ==
Little Mehoopany Creek begins in Sharpe Pond in Windham Township. The creek flows east-northeast and then turns southeast for a few tenths of a mile before entering Nergo Pond, where it receives an unnamed tributary from the right. Several tenths of a mile to the east, it empties into Chamberlain Pond. Several tenths of a mile to the southeast, the creek flows in a northeasterly direction for a few tenths of a mile, passing by Jenningsville, before turning southeast for a few tenths of a mile and then east for a few tenths of a mile. The creek then enters Jennings Pond and heads east for several tenths of a mile. Exiting this pond, it meanders east-southeast for several tenths of a mile before meandering northeast and then east-southeast for a few miles, its valley getting progressively deeper. In this reach, the creek enters Mehoopany Township, where it eventually turns north for a few tenths of a mile before turning east for several tenths of a mile. It then turns southeast for several tenths of a mile, passing through an unnamed pond much smaller than the ones upstream. The creek then turns east, passing through North Mehoopany and crossing Pennsylvania Route 87 before reaching its confluence with the Susquehanna River.

Little Mehoopany Creek joins the Susquehanna River 231.76 miles (372.98 km) upstream of its mouth.

== Hydrology ==
Little Mehoopany Creek is not designated as an impaired waterbody. There are zero miles of impaired streams in the creek's watershed.

The average discharge of Little Mehoopany Creek is 13.9 cubic feet per second (0.39 m^{3}/s) at a monitoring station near its mouth. The maximum time for water to flow from the headwaters to the mouth is 8 hours and 50 minutes. In a study of the creek's watershed by the Mehoopany Creek Watershed Association in the early 2000s, the water temperature of the creek at a fire company property ranged from 34 to 76 °F (1 to 24 °C). At a bridge near an elementary school the water temperature ranged from 34 to 70 °F (1 to 21 °C), and at the Davenport property, it ranged from 34 to 69 °F (1 to 21 °C). The Jenningsville site had the broadest temperature range: 33 to 76 °F (1 to 24 °C).

At the, the pH of Little Mehoopany Creek ranged from 6.2 to 8.1, though only two measurements were under 7, and the alkalinity ranged from 20 to 50 milligrams per liter (0.020 to 0.050 oz/cu ft). At the elementary school, it ranged from 7.1 to 8.4 and at the Davenport property, it ranged from 7.3 to 9.1. The alkalinity at these sites was 40 and 25 to 35 milligrams per liter (0.040 and 0.025 to 0.035 oz/cu ft), respectively. At Jenningsville, the pH was between 6.7 and 9.6, while the alkalinity ranged from 25 to 55 milligrams per liter (0.025 to 0.055 oz/cu ft). Some amound of strontium has been discovered in the creek.

== Geography and geology ==
The elevation near the mouth of Little Mehoopany Creek is 610 feet (190 m) above sea level. The elevation near the stream's source is 1,139 feet (347 m) above sea level. Despite its name, Little Mehoopany Creek is not actually a tributary of Mehoopany Creek, but instead joins the Susquehanna River 1,200 feet (370 m) further upstream.

The Water Resources Inventory Report describes several lakes on Little Mehoopany Creek, which are now known as Sharpe Pond, Chamberlain Pond, Negro Pond, and Jennings Pond. All of these lakes are artificial. The Water Resources Inventory Report described Little Mehoopany Creek as being 6 feet (1.8 m) wide and 0.5 feet (0.15 m) deep at the outlet of Sharpe Pond, flowing through a clear channel. By the inlet of Negro Pond, Little Mehoopany Creek was still 6 feet (1.8 m) wide, but deepened to 1 foot (0.30 m) through a marshy channel, increasing to 20 feet (6.1 m) wide and 2 feet (0.61 m) deep at the outlet, and reverting to a clear channel.

At Chamberlain Pond, Little Mehoopany Creek was 10 feet (3.0 m) wide and 2 feet (0.61 m) deep at the inlet and 20 feet (6.1 m) wide and 3 feet (0.91 m) deep at the outlet, again through a clear channel. At the inlet of Jennings Pond, shrank to 15 feet (4.6 m) and 2 feet (0.61 m) deep, increasing to 20 feet (6.1 m) wide at the outlet, but retaining the same depth. Both the inlet and the outlet were described as having a clear, rocky channel.

The underlying geology in the watershed of Little Mehoopany Creek is primarily interbedded sedimentary rock and sandstone. The main rock formation in the watershed is the Catskill Formation, but a small area of Huntley Mountain Formation occurs in the southernmost corner of the creek's watershed.

The primary soil association in the watershed of Little Mehoopany Creek is the Wellsboro-Oquaga-Morris, but the Volusia-Mardin-Lordstown occurs in a few areas in the northern part of the watershed. Very small areas of the Chenango-Pope-Holly and the Lackawanna-Arnot-Morris occur along the borders of the watershed, at the mouth and in the southernmost part, respectively. A 2003 study encountered no significant erosion problems in the creek's watershed.

== Watershed and biology ==
The watershed of Little Mehoopany Creek has an area of 11.3 square miles (29 km^{2}). The mouth of the creek is in the United States Geological Survey quadrangle of Meshoppen. However, the source is in the quadrangle of Jenningsville. The creek joins the Susquehanna River at North Mehoopany. Its watershed contains 11 miles (18 km) of streams. In addition to Windham Township and Mehoopany Township, through which the creek flows, the watershed also contains part of North Branch Township and reaches the border of Forkston Township.

In 2006, the land use in the watershed of Little Mehoopany Creek was mostly forested and agricultural land, with 67.5 percent being the former and 26.1 percent being the latter. An additional 2.6 percent was water, 2.1 percent was grassland and herbaceous land, 0.9 percent was wetlands, and 0.8 percent was developed. There was no barren land. The wetlands occur throughout the watershed. There are four large lacustrine wetlands along the creek and numerous palustrine wetlands of various sizes scattered throughout the watershed.

The population of the Little Mehoopany Creek's watershed was 330 people, indicating an average population density of 29 people per square mile (11 people per square kilometer). One of the only residential areas in the watershed is at Jenningsville, at the intersection of State Routes 3001, 4001, and 4002.

Little Mehoopany Creek is capable of flooding substantially; in Hurricane Irene, the creek's flooding drove many people from nearby homes.

The drainage basin of Little Mehoopany Creek is designed as a Coldwater Fishery and a Migratory Fishery.

== History and industries ==
Little Mehoopany Creek was entered into the Geographic Names Information System on August 2, 1979. Its identifier in the Geographic Names Information System is 1179597.

A gristmill was built on Little Mehoopany Creek by William, Joseph, and John Carney in 1806. A log schoolhouse was also constructed on the creek and served as a meeting place for the Mehoopany Baptist Church until 1834. Historically, canal boats would also enter the creek to unload their wares at the Jennings and Kitner Store.

A concrete slab bridge carrying State Route 3001 over Little Mehoopany Creek was built in Windham Township in 1955 and is 24.0 feet (7.3 m) long. A 38.1-foot (11.6 m) prestressed box beam or girders bridge carrying State Route 4002 over the creek was built in 1969 in Mehoopany Township. Another bridge of the same type, but carrying T443 and 41.0 feet (12.5 m) long, was built over the creek in 1996. Replacement of the State Route 3001 bridge was slated and/or carried out in the summer of 2017.

The watersheds of Little Mehoopany Creek and Mehoopany Creek were studied by the firm Borton-Lawson Engineering in 2003. In the 2000s, Mehoopany Township expressed a desire to build a boat launch at the confluence of Little Mehoopany Creek with the Susquehanna River for a cost of $20,000 or more. Other projects proposed in the watershed include the $18,000 construction of a shed to hold anti-skid material near the creek.

As of 2006, there are eight drilling pads for natural gas in the watershed of Little Mehoopany Creek. There are no permitted water withdrawals for natural gas, no groundwater or surface withdrawals for public water, and no NPDES sites in the watershed. The Mehoopany Creek Watershed Association, despite its name, is also active in the Little Mehoopany Creek watershed, and has received grants for educational outreach and conservation projects. The Susquehanna River Basin Commission installed a remote water quality monitor on the creek in September 2010.

== See also ==
- Mehoopany Creek, next tributary of the Susquehanna River going downriver
- Meshoppen Creek, next tributary of the Susquehanna River going upriver
- List of rivers of Pennsylvania
