= Red Brook (Stony Brook tributary) =

Physical characteristics
- Source
  - location: Coalbed Swamp in Forkston Township, Wyoming County, Pennsylvania
  - elevation: 2,210 feet (670 m)
- Mouth
  - location: Stony Brook in Forkston Township, Wyoming County, Pennsylvania near Kasson Brook
  - coordinates: 41°28′35″N 76°11′06″W
  - elevation: 1,568 feet (478 m)
- Length: 1.7 mi (2.7 km)
- Basin size: 1.86 sq mi (4.8 km^{2})

Basin features
- Progression: Stony Brook → Mehoopany Creek → Susquehanna River → Chesapeake Bay

Red Brook is a tributary of Stony Brook in Wyoming County, Pennsylvania, in the United States. It is approximately 1.7 miles (2.7 km) long and flows through Forkston Township. The watershed of the stream has an area of 1.86 square miles (4.8 km^{2}). The stream has been named one of the best places for hiking in Wyoming County and features waterfalls, cascades, cliffs, and boulders. Its headwaters are in Coalbed Swamp, a combined boreal conifer swamp and shrub swamp.

== Course ==
Red Brook begins on Dutch Mountain in Coalbed Swamp, in Forkston Township. It flows northeast for a short distance before turning east-southeast and entering a valley. After several tenths of a mile, the stream turns east-northeast for several tenths of a mile. It then reaches its confluence with Stony Brook.

Red Brook joins Stony Brook 1.86 miles (2.99 km) upstream of its mouth.

== Geography and geology ==
The elevation near the mouth of Red Brook is 1,568 feet (478 m) above sea level. The elevation near the stream's source is 2,210 feet (670 m) above sea level.

Geographical features along Red Brook include two large waterfalls, a number of smaller cascades, large boulders (some of which are covered with moss), and cliffs. The headwaters of the stream are located in Coalbed Swamp, which is part of a complex of wetlands at the summit of Dutch Mountain.

== Hydrology and watershed ==
The watershed of Red Brook has an area of 1.94 square miles (5.0 km^{2}). The stream is entirely within the United States Geological Survey quadrangle of Dutch Mountain. Its mouth is located near Kasson Brook. The designated use of the stream is for aquatic life.

Red Brook is not designated as an impaired waterbody.

== History and recreation ==
Red Brook was entered into the Geographic Names Information System on August 2, 1979. Its identifier in the Geographic Names Information System is 1199361.

Historical features in the vicinity of Red Brook include an old railroad grade and the remains of an old camp. The stream has been named one of the top ten places for hiking in Wyoming County. It has been described by Jeff Mitchell as "A special place in Wyoming County." Logging was probably done in the Coalbed Swamp area of the stream's watershed in the 1890s, but it is currently in good condition.

== Biology ==
Coalbed Swamp, which is in the watershed of Red Brook, is listed on the Wyoming County Natural Areas Inventory. This swamp is home to part of the largest population of yellow-bellied flycatchers in Pennsylvania. The swamp has an area of 140 acres (57 ha), about half of which is a boreal conifer swamp dominated by red spruce. The rest of the area consists of a shrub swamp dominated by blueberry bushes, leatherleaf, and sedges.

== See also ==
- List of rivers of Pennsylvania
