= Red Brook (disambiguation) =

Red Brook is a minor river in Greater Manchester in North West England.

Red Brook may also refer to:

- Red Brook (Stony Brook), a tributary of Stony Brook in Wyoming County, Pennsylvania, in the United States
- Red Brook, Newfoundland and Labrador, a settlement in Cape St. George

== See also ==
- Redbrook, a village in Gloucestershire, England, adjoining the border with Monmouthshire, Wales
