= Stony Brook (Mehoopany Creek tributary) =

Coordinates: 41.4673°N 76.1615°W

Stony Brook is a tributary of Mehoopany Creek in Wyoming County, Pennsylvania, in the United States. It is approximately 4.3 miles (6.9 km) long and flows through North Branch township and Forkston Township. The brook has a tributary known as Red Brook. Logging was done in the upper reaches of the watershed of Stony Brook in the early 1900s.

== Course ==
Stony Brook begins in North Branch Township. It enters a valley and flows southeast for approximately two miles (three kilometers) before turning south and entering Forkston Township. Shortly afterwards, the brook receives the tributary Red Brook and turns east. Further downstream, it bends south and then southwest before it reaches its confluence with Mehoopany Creek.

Stony Brook joins Mehoopany Creek 12.20 miles (19.63 km) upstream of its mouth.

=== Tributaries ===
Stony Brook has a tributary known as Red Brook, which has a watershed of 2.3 square miles (6.0 km^{2}).

== Geography and geology ==
The elevation near the mouth of Stony Brook is 1,082 feet (330 m) above sea level. The elevation of the source of the brook is between 2,200 and 2,220 ft (670 and 680 m).

There are two conglomerates in the vicinity of Stony Brook. Coal is also found close to the brook. By the late 1800s, a thousand tons of coal had been mined in the area.

== Watershed ==
The watershed of Stony Brook has an area of 6.87 square miles (17.8 km^{2}).

== History and industries ==
Logging has historically taken place in the watershed of Stony Brook. Between 1911 and 1916, between 30,000 and 40,000 feet (9,100 and 12,200 m) of wood per day were logged at the headwaters of the brook and at Crane Swamp. Most of this wood was spruce.

== Biology ==
Stony Brook is inhabited by native trout. It is well known to locals for this reason.

== See also ==
- Henry Lott Brook, next tributary of Mehoopany Creek going downstream
- Somer Brook, next tributary of Mehoopany Creek going upstream
- List of rivers of Pennsylvania
