= Ricketts, Pennsylvania =

Ghost town in Pennsylvania, US

Ricketts
- Ghost town
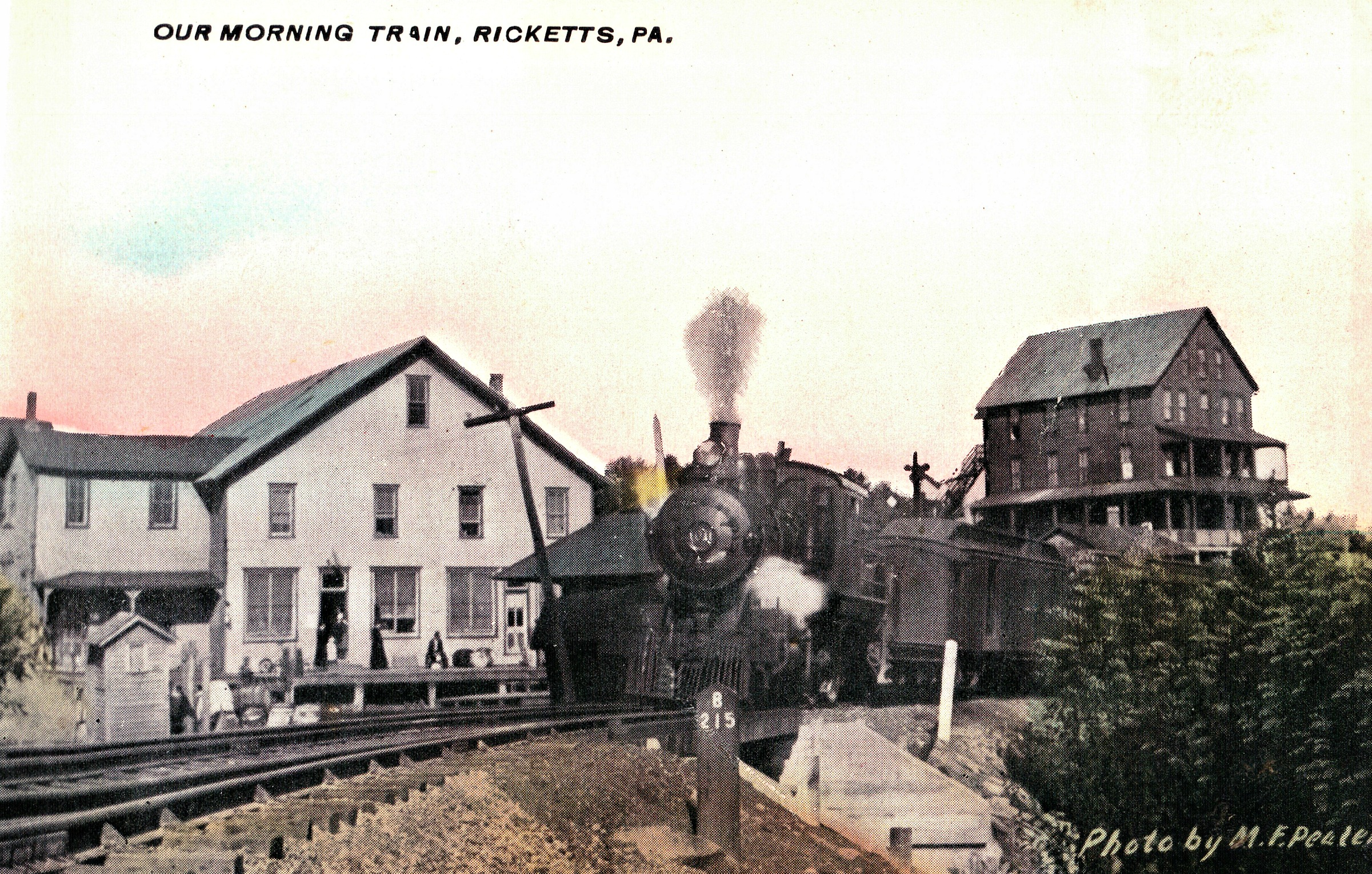
- Postcard of Ricketts, showing the Lehigh Valley Railroad train

- Location within Pennsylvania Location within the United States
- Coordinates: 41°23′28″N 76°16′40″W
- Country: United States of America
- State: Pennsylvania
- County: Sullivan and Wyoming
- Township: Colley (Sullivan) and Forkston (Wyoming)

Population
  - Total: 0

Ricketts is a ghost town that was established as a lumber mill company town in Sullivan and Wyoming counties, in the U.S. state of Pennsylvania. Ricketts was built in 1890 along Mehoopany Creek in both Colley Township in Sullivan County and Forkston Township in Wyoming County for sawmills of the Trexler and Turrell Lumber Company. It was named for Robert Bruce Ricketts, who owned most of the land and timber around the village, and who was a partner in the company with Harry Clay Trexler, J. H. Turrell, and others. Ricketts had 800 inhabitants at its peak and extended into the northernmost section of what is now Ricketts Glen State Park. Rail lines were built to the mills at Ricketts, including the Bowman Creek branch of the Lehigh Valley Railroad which opened in 1893. The mills closed in 1913 when the lumber was exhausted and the last house was torn down in the 1930s.
