= Taques Creek =

Physical characteristics
- Source
  - location: valley in Washington Township, Wyoming County, Pennsylvania
  - elevation: 938 feet (286 m)
- Mouth
  - location: Susquehanna River on the border between Washington Township and Tunkhannock Township, Wyoming County, Pennsylvania near Tunkhannock
  - coordinates: 41°33′45″N 75°58′57″W
  - elevation: 594 feet (181 m)
- Length: 2.9 mi (4.7 km)
- Basin size: 4.96 sq mi (12.8 km^{2})

Basin features
- Progression: Susquehanna River → Chesapeake Bay
- Tributaries
  - left: one unnamed tributary
  - right: one unnamed tributary

Taques Creek is a tributary of the Susquehanna River in Wyoming County, Pennsylvania, in the United States. It is approximately 2.9 miles (4.7 km) long and flows through Washington Township and Tunkhannock Township. The watershed of the creek has an area of 4.96 square miles (12.8 km^{2}). The creek is not designated as an impaired waterbody and has no named tributaries. Its watershed is designated as a Coldwater Fishery and a Migratory Fishery.

== Course ==
Taques Creek begins in a valley in Washington Township to the southeast of Yahmer Hill and to the southwest of Valentine Hill. It flows south for several tenths of a mile before reaching the border between Washington Township and Tunkhannock Township, where it continues to flow south. After several tenths of a mile, the creek crosses US Route 6 and receives two unnamed tributaries (one from the left and one from the right. It then turns south-southeast for several tenths of a mile before turning south-southwest. After several tenths of a mile, the creek reaches the end of its valley, crosses a railroad, and reaches its confluence with the Susquehanna River.

Taques Creek is approximately 2.9 miles (4.7 km) long. The creek joins Tunkhannock Creek 222.76 miles (358.50 km) upstream of its mouth.

== Hydrology, geography, and geology ==
The elevation near the mouth of Taques Creek is 594 feet (181 m) above sea level. The elevation near the source of the creek is 938 feet (286 m) above sea level.

The surficial geology near the mouth of Taques Creek mainly consists of a till known as Wisconsinan Till and bedrock consisting of sandstone and shale, though there is some fill and alluvium at the mouth. Further upstream, the surficial geology along the creek itself mainly consists of alluvium, though most of the rest of the valley is Wisconsinan Till. However, there are patches of fill and alluvial terrace, as well as a few small lakes near the headwaters.

Taques Creek is not designated as an impaired waterbody.

== Watershed and biology ==
The watershed of Taques Creek has an area of 4.96 square miles (12.8 km^{2}). The creek is entirely within the United States Geological Survey quadrangle of Tunkhannock. Its mouth is located near Tunkhannock.

The drainage basin of Taques Creek is designated as a Coldwater Fishery and a Migratory Fishery. The designated use for the creek is aquatic life.

== History ==
Taques Creek was entered into the Geographic Names Information System on August 2, 1979. Its identifier in the Geographic Names Information System is 1189269.

Frac fluid was once reported to have been accidentally discharged into a drainage ditch in the watershed of Taques Creek. A facility known as Tyler Memorial Hospital received a permit in 2013 to discharge treated sewage into an unnamed tributary of the creek. The permit will expire in October 2018.

In 2013, bids were sought for a bridge rehabilitation project involving a bridge carrying T-518 over Taques Creek.

== See also ==
- Tunkhannock Creek (Susquehanna River), next tributary of the Susquehanna River going downstream
- Mehoopany Creek, next tributary of the Susquehanna River going upstream
- List of rivers of Pennsylvania
