= Fox Hollow (Oregon County, Missouri) =

Valley in Missouri, U.S.

Coordinates: 36°47′20″N 91°16′22″W

Fox Hollow is a valley in Oregon County in the U.S. state of Missouri.

Fox Hollow was so named on account of foxes in the area.
