= Fox Hollow (Rensselaer County, New York) =

Valley in the county of Rensselaer, New York State

Coordinates: 42°50′23″N 73°22′30″W

Fox Hollow is a valley in Rensselaer County of the U.S. state of New York.

The University of the State of New York speculates the valley may be named after Levit Fox, or after foxes in the area.
