= Forkston, Pennsylvania =

- Unincorporated community
- Location within Pennsylvania
- Coordinates: 41°31′42″N 76°07′33″W
- Country: United States
- State: Pennsylvania
- County: Wyoming
- Elevation: 787 ft (240 m)
- Time zone: UTC-5 (Eastern (EST))
  - Summer (DST): UTC-4 (EDT)
- Area code: 570
- GNIS feature ID: 1192480

Forkston is an unincorporated community in Forkston Township, Wyoming County, Pennsylvania, United States.
