= Bellasylva, Pennsylvania =

- Unincorporated community
- Location within Pennsylvania
- Coordinates: 41°27′25″N 76°14′20″W
- Country: United States
- State: Pennsylvania
- County: Wyoming
- Elevation: 2,116 ft (645 m)
- Time zone: UTC-5 (Eastern (EST))
  - Summer (DST): UTC-4 (EDT)
- Area code: 570
- GNIS feature ID: 1198410

Bellasylva (also Bella Sylva) is an unincorporated community in Forkston Township, Wyoming County, Pennsylvania, United States.
