= Mehoopany Township, Pennsylvania =

Township in Pennsylvania, US

Mehoopany Township
- Township
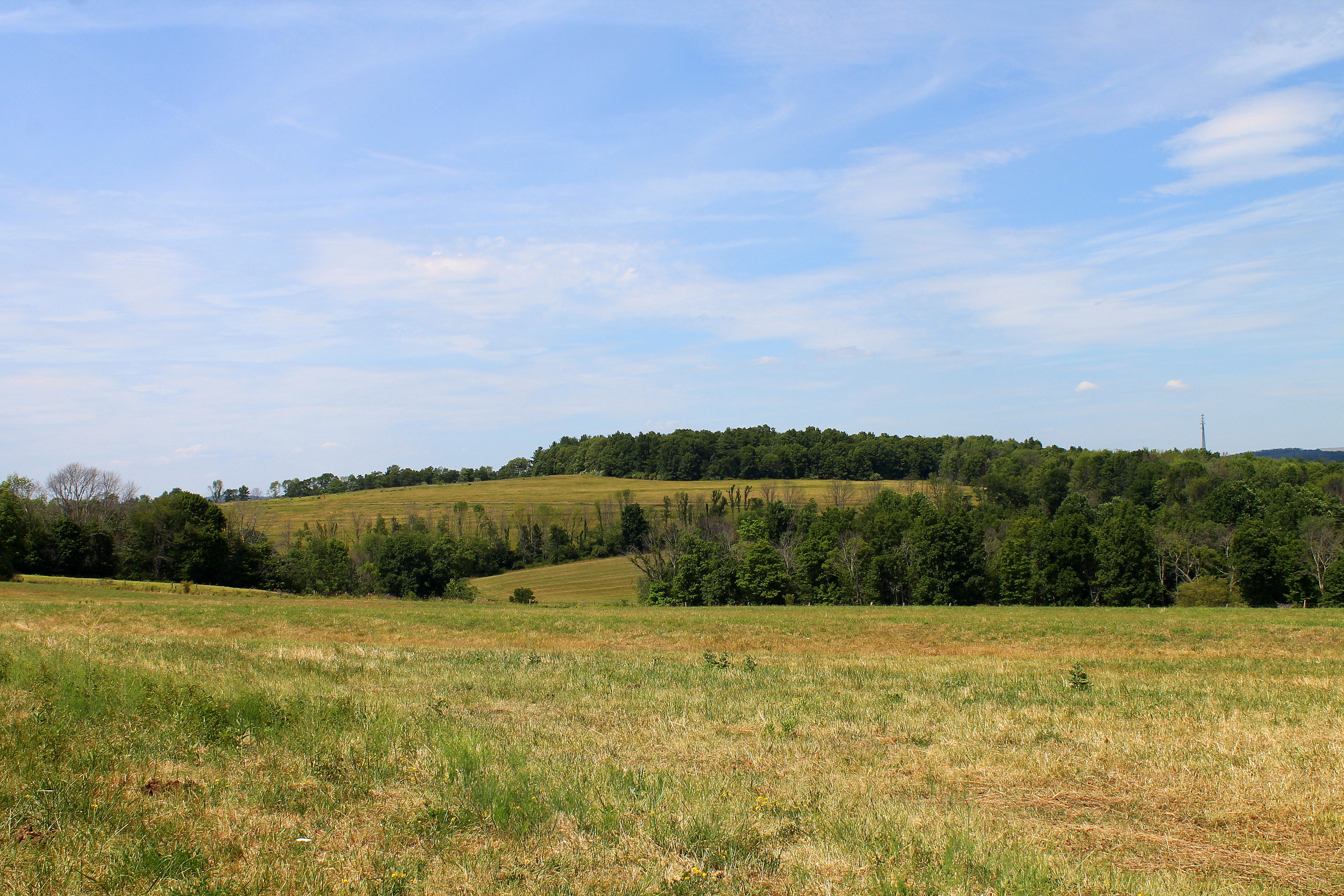
- Fields in Mehoopany Township

- Location of Pennsylvania in the United States
- Coordinates: 41°33′00″N 76°04′59″W
- Country: United States
- State: Pennsylvania
- County: Wyoming

Area
  - Total: 17.89 sq mi (46.33 km^{2})
  - Land: 17.18 sq mi (44.50 km^{2})
  - Water: 0.71 sq mi (1.83 km^{2})
- Elevation: 1,447 ft (441 m)

Population (2020)
  - Total: 896 ▲
  - Estimate (2021): 897
  - Density: 52.3/sq mi (20.18/km^{2})
- Time zone: UTC-5 (EST)
  - Summer (DST): UTC-4 (EDT)
- ZIP Code: 18629, 18657
- Area code: 570
- FIPS code: 42-131-48528

Mehoopany Township is a township in Wyoming County, Pennsylvania, United States. The population was 896 at the 2020 census.

== Geography ==
According to the United States Census Bureau, the township has a total area of 17.9 square miles (46 km^{2}), of which 17.2 square miles (45 km^{2}) is land and 0.7 square miles (1.8 km^{2}) (3.91%) is water.

== Demographics ==
Historical population
Census	Pop.	Note	%±
2010	892		—
2020	896		0.4%
2021 (est.)	897		0.1%
U.S. Decennial Census

As of the census of 2010, there were 892 people, 335 households, and 252 families residing in the township. The population density was 51.9 people per square mile (20.0 people/km^{2}). There were 406 housing units at an average density of 23.7 units per square mile (9.2 units/km^{2}). The racial makeup of the township was 96.4% White, 1% African American, 0.8% Native American, 0.2% Asian, 0.2% some other race, and 1.3% from two or more races.

There were 335 households, out of which 34.3% had children under the age of 18 living with them, 56.1% were married couples living together, 12.2% had a female householder with no husband present, and 24.8% were non-families. 20.3% of all households were made up of individuals, and 6% had someone living alone who was 65 years of age or older. The average household size was 2.66 and the average family size was 3.01.

In the township the population was spread out, with 24.8% under the age of 18, 61.2% from 18 to 64, and 14% who were 65 years of age or older. The median age was 40 years.

The median income for a household in the township was $47,778, and the median income for a family was $54,750. Males had a median income of $37,000 versus $33,611 for females. The per capita income for the township was $21,962. About 10.2% of families and 15.2% of the population were below the poverty line, including 29.9% of those under age 18 and 2.1% of those age 65 or over.
