= Mehoopany Creek =

River in Pennsylvania, United States

Coordinates: 41°34′26″N 76°03′31″W

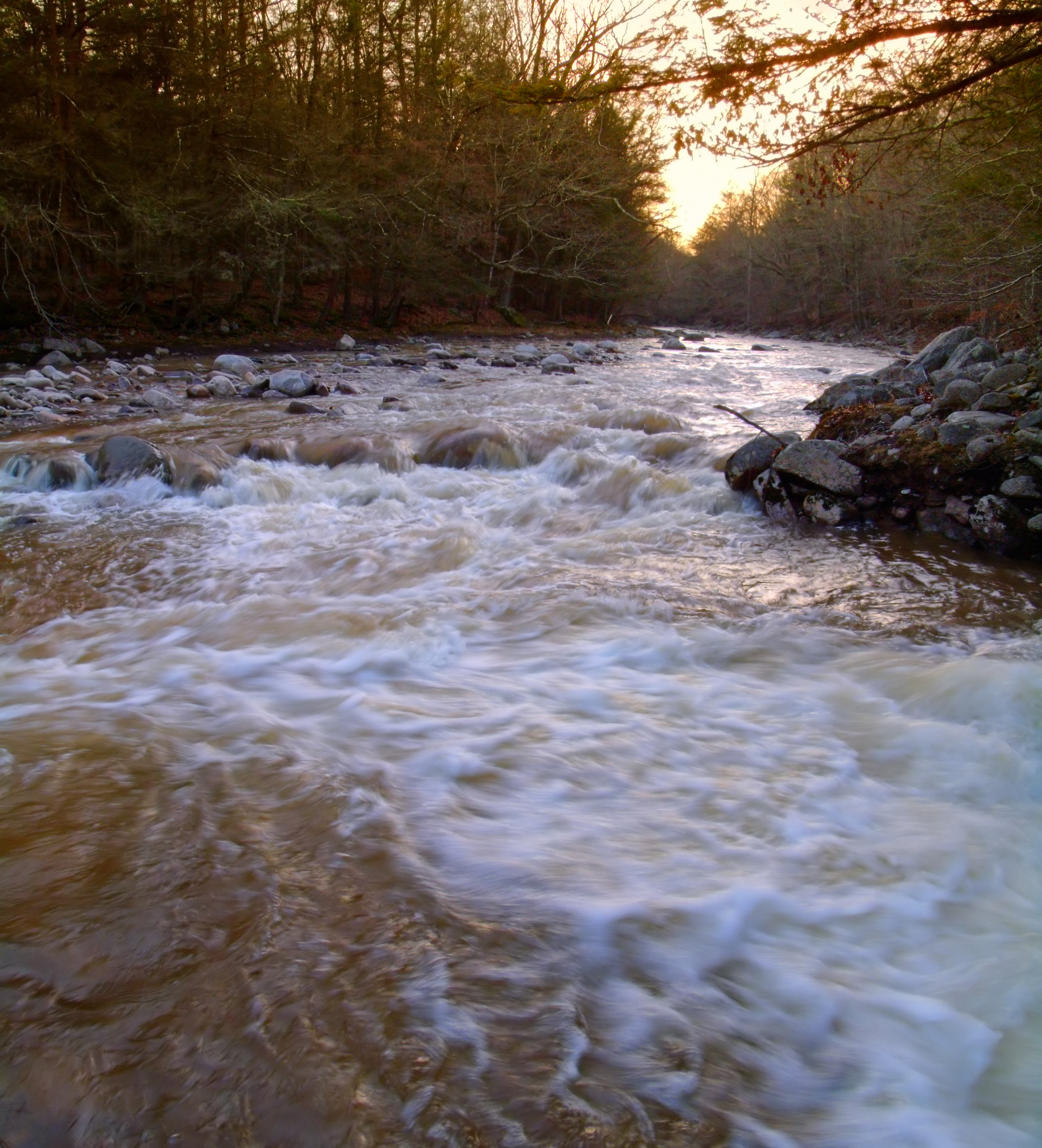
Mehoopany Creek in Forkston Township, Wyoming County, Pennsylvania

Mehoopany Creek is a tributary of the Susquehanna River in Sullivan and Wyoming counties, Pennsylvania, in the United States. It is approximately 26.8 miles (43.1 km) long. In Sullivan County the creek flows through Colley Township and in Wyoming County it flows through Forkston Township and Mehoopany Township. The stream's watershed has an area of 123 square miles (320 km^{2}). Its major tributaries include Stony Brook and North Fork Mehoopany Creek.

Mehoopany Creek is designated as a high-quality coldwater fishery in Sullivan County. Its headwaters are listed in the Sullivan County Natural Areas Inventory.

== Course ==
Mehoopany Creek begins in Splashdam Pond in Colley Township, just west of the eastern border of Sullivan County. The creek flows north and then east. It leaves Sullivan County approximately a mile from its headwaters.

Upon leaving Sullivan County, Mehoopany Creek enters Forkstown Township, Wyoming County. In this township, it flows roughly east, entering a valley. It dips southeast, picking up the tributary Bellas Brook, and then flows in a northeasterly direction for several miles. Along the way, the creek passes Short Mountain and receives the tributary South Brook, along with numerous other tributaries. At Flat Top, it turns north for a few miles, receiving the tributary White Creek. The creek's valley becomes shallower and it receives the tributary North Fork Mehoopany Creek. It then turns northeast and enters Mehoopany Township. The creek meanders for several miles through this township before reaching its confluence with the Susquehanna River near the community of North Mehoopany.

Mehoopany Creek joins the Susquehanna River 231.52 miles (372.60 km) upstream of its mouth.

=== Tributaries ===
Tributaries of Mehoopany Creek include Stony Brook, North Fork Mehoopany Creek, and numerous others. North Fork Mehoopany Creek joins Mehoopany Creek 6.26 miles (10.07 km) upstream of its mouth and its watershed has an area of 40.00 square miles (103.6 km^{2}). Stony Brook joins Mehoopany Creek 12.20 miles (19.63 km) upstream of its mouth. The watershed of this brook has an area of 6.87 square miles (17.8 km^{2}).

== Hydrology ==
The average rate of precipitation in the watershed of Mehoopany Creek ranges from 35 to 45 inches (89 to 114 cm) per year.

Mehoopany Creek is acidic in early spring.

== Geography and geology ==
The elevation near the mouth of Mehoopany Creek is 604 feet (184 m) above sea level. The elevation of the creek's source is between 2,040 feet (620 m) and 2,080 feet (630 m). Its elevation decreases at a rate of 88 feet (27 m) per mile in its upper reaches.

The topography of the watershed of Mehoopany Creek is described as "rough and hilly" in a 1921 book. The watershed has numerous steep hills, with heights from 900 to 1,000 feet (270 to 300 m). The creek's channel is sinuous. The creek has alluvial floodplains in its lower reaches.

Mehoopany Creek flows through rock formations of shale and sandstone.

Mehoopany Creek has "dangerously situated strainers" and major rapids in places.

== Watershed ==
The watershed of Mehoopany Creek has an area of 123 square miles (320 km^{2}). The watershed is in three counties: Sullivan County, Wyoming County, and Bradford County.

The watershed of Mehoopany Creek is forested. Lakes and swamps are present in its upper reaches. One lake in the watershed is Grant Lake, which has a surface area of 68.8 acres.

There are a number of communities in the watershed of Mehoopany Creek. In 1921, the largest were Mehoopany, with a population of 648; Ricketts, with a population of 275; and Forkston, with a population of 210. Major roads in the watershed include Pennsylvania Route 87.

== History, etymology, and industries ==
A gauging station was established on Mehoopany Creek in January 1914.

Industries done in the watershed of Mehoopany Creek in the early 1900s included agriculture. The creek also provided water power for a number of mills. The Lehigh Valley Railroad also traversed the upper part of the watershed in this period. Logging has been done near the headwaters of the creek.

== Biology ==
Mehoopany Creek and its drainage basin is designated as a high-quality coldwater fishery in Sullivan County. A total of 9.8 miles (15.8 km) of the creek are stocked with fish. However, native trout are also present in the watershed, especially in the tributary Stony Brook.

The headwaters of Mehoopany Creek are "one of the two highest priority sites in the [Sullivan] county" according to their listing in the Sullivan County Natural Areas Inventory. These headwaters are a wetland complex, which contains several rare plant species. However, the wetlands are mostly dominated by blueberry plants.

The headwaters of Mehoopany Creek are home to three plant species that are rare or endangered in Pennsylvania.

== Recreation ==
Mehoopany Creek is suitable for intermediate and novice canoers. The creek is easier to canoe on in its lower reaches than in its upper reaches and the scenery on the creek is described as "good". The American Whitewater Association's difficulty ranking of the creek ranges from I to III during normal flow conditions.

Mehoopany Creek flows through Pennsylvania State Game Lands in many places.

== See also ==
- Taques Creek, next tributary of the Susquehanna River going downstream
- Little Mehoopany Creek, next tributary of the Susquehanna River going upstream
- List of rivers of Pennsylvania
