= Forkston Township, Wyoming County, Pennsylvania =

Township in Pennsylvania, US

Forkston Township
- Township
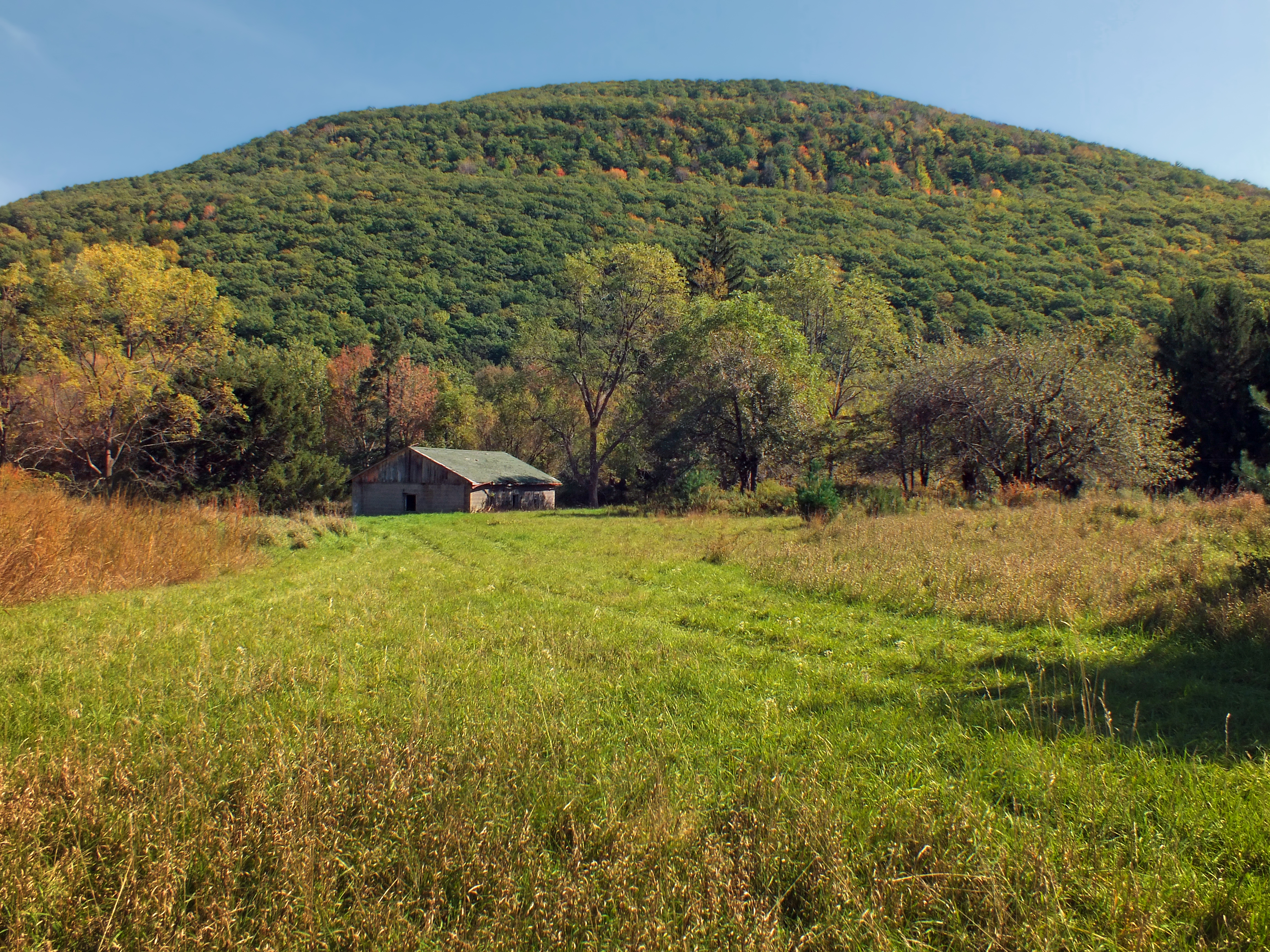
- State Game Lands on an abandoned farm in the township

- Location of Pennsylvania in the United States
- Coordinates: 41°29′00″N 76°04′59″W
- Country: United States
- State: Pennsylvania
- County: Wyoming

Area
  - Total: 70.57 sq mi (182.77 km^{2})
  - Land: 70.40 sq mi (182.34 km^{2})
  - Water: 0.17 sq mi (0.43 km^{2})
- Elevation: 2,208 ft (673 m)

Population (2020)
  - Total: 305 ▼
  - Estimate (2021): 304
  - Density: 5.4/sq mi (2.07/km^{2})
- Time zone: UTC-5 (EST)
  - Summer (DST): UTC-4 (EDT)
- Area code: 570
- FIPS code: 42-131-26752

Forkston Township is a township in Wyoming County, Pennsylvania, United States. The population was 305 at the 2020 census.

== Geography ==
According to the United States Census Bureau, the township has a total area of 70.6 square miles (183 km^{2}), of which 70.4 square miles (182 km^{2}) is land and 0.2 square miles (0.5 km^{2}, or 0.28%) is water.

== Demographics ==
Historical population
Census	Pop.	Note	%±
2010	397		—
2020	305		−23.2%
2021 (est.)	304		−0.3%
U.S. Decennial Census

At the census of 2010, 397 people (in 170 households and 108 families) resided in the Township. The population density was 5.6 people per square mile (2.2 people/km^{2}). The Township held 294 housing units, an average density of 4.2 per square mile (1.6/km^{2}). The racial makeup of the township was 98% White, 1% American Indian, 0.25% Asian, 0.25% from other races, and 0.5% from two or more races; Hispanic or Latino persons of any race comprised 0.5% of the population.

Of the 170 households, 22.4% had children under the age of 18 living with them, 54.7% were married couples living together, 4.7% had a female householder with no husband present, and 36.5% were non-families. Single persons comprised 31.8% of all households; 11.8% were single persons aged at least 65 years. The average household size was 2.34 persons, the average family size, 2.94.

The population of the Township was spread out. People younger than 18 years were 17.9% of the population; 18 to 64, 64.7%; and those aged at least 65 were 17.4% of the population. The median age was 46.3 years.

The median income for a household in the Township was $47,266; the median income for a family was $65,417. Males had a median income of $39,519, compared to a median income of $17,188 for females. The per capita income in the Township was $24,474. About 10.5% of families and 13.8% of the population were below the poverty line, including 21.8% of those under age 18 and 4.9% of those aged 65 or more.
