= Shanty Run =

Coordinates: 41°20′39″N 76°22′07″W

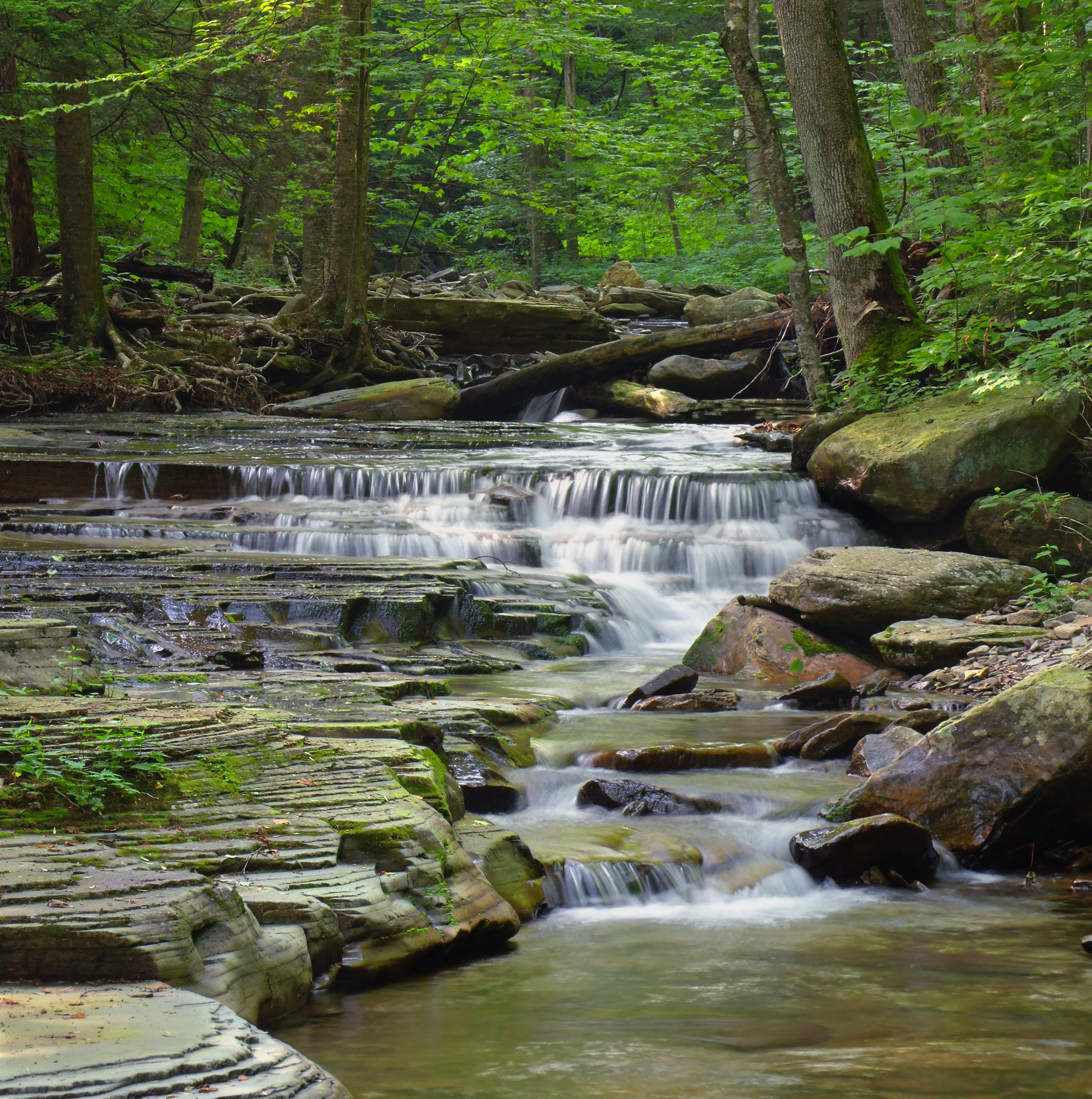
- Shanty Run

Physical characteristics
- Source
  - location: Davidson Township, Sullivan County, Pennsylvania
  - elevation: 2,380 to 2,400 feet (730 to 730 m)
- Mouth
  - location: Quinn Run in Davidson Township, Sullivan County, Pennsylvania
  - elevation: 1,627 ft (496 m)
- Length: 1.4 mi (2.3 km)
- Basin size: 0.67 mi^{2} (1.7 km^{2})
- Discharge
  - average: 472 US gallons per minute (0.0298 m^{3}/s)

Basin features
- Progression: Quinn Run → Heberly Run → East Branch Fishing Creek → Fishing Creek (North Branch Susquehanna River) → Susquehanna River → Chesapeake Bay

Shanty Run is a tributary of Quinn Run in Sullivan County, Pennsylvania, in the United States. It is approximately 1.4 miles (2.3 km) long and flows through Davidson Township. The watershed of the stream has an area of 0.67 square miles (1.7 km^{2}). The stream is acidic and is considered by the Pennsylvania Department of Environmental Protection to be impaired by atmospheric deposition. Rock formations in the watershed include the Huntley Mountain Formation and the Burgoon Sandstone. Soils in the watershed include the Deep-Wellsboro-Oquaga, Oquaga, and Norwich soil associations.

== Course ==
Shanty Run begins in Davidson Township. It flows east for a short distance before turning south. It then turns south-southwest and enters a steep valley. At the end of the valley, the stream reaches its confluence with Quinn Run.

Shanty Run joins Quinn Run 0.48 miles (0.77 km) upstream of its mouth.

=== Tributaries ===
Shanty Run has an unnamed tributary known as Unt 28004.

== Hydrology ==
The discharge of Shanty Run is 472 gallons per minute during average flow conditions. The stream's pH during average flow conditions is 5.76 and the concentration of aluminum is 0.107 milligrams per liter. The pH ranges from considerably less than 5 to nearly 7.

Shanty Run experiences episodic acidification. The water quality of the stream is considered to be "fair" during average flow conditions and "very poor" during high flow conditions. It requires an additional alkalinity load of 1 pound (0.45 kg) to be restored to the satisfaction of the East Branch Fishing Creek Restoration Plan. Proposed methods of increasing the stream's alkalinity include forest surface liming and road liming.

A total of 1.69 miles (2.72 km) of Shanty Run are considered by the Pennsylvania Department of Environmental Protection to be impaired due to atmospheric deposition caused by the stream's pH. 0.30 miles (0.48 km) of Shanty Run's unnamed tributary experience the same impairment.

== Geography and geology ==
The elevation near the mouth of Shanty Run is 1,627 feet (496 m) above sea level. The elevation of the stream's source is between 2,380 feet (730 m) and 2,400 feet (730 m).

The lower reaches of Shanty Run are on rock of the Huntley Mountain Formation. The upper reaches are on Burgoon Sandstone. Some rock outcroppings are present near the stream.

Shanty Run flows over soil of the Deep-Wellsboro-Oquaga association in its lower reaches. In its upper reaches, it flows over soil of the Oquaga soil association and the Norris soil association. All of the soils in the watershed are strongly acidic.

== Watershed ==
The watershed of Shanty Run has an area of 0.67 square miles (1.7 km^{2}). There are 1.8 miles (2.9 km) of streams in the watershed of the stream. It is entirely within Pennsylvania State Game Lands.

Part of Shanty Run is accessible by road.

== History ==
The restoration of Shanty Run is part of the second phase of the East Branch Fishing Creek Restoration Plan. This phase, which also includes Quinn Run, is estimated to cost $300,000.

Shanty Run and its unnamed tributary were first listed by the Pennsylvania Department of Environmental Protection as impaired in 2002. As of December 2011, the total maximum daily load date for the stream is 2015.

== See also ==
- List of tributaries of Fishing Creek (North Branch Susquehanna River)
