= Hunts Run =

River in Pennsylvania, US

Coordinates: 41°20′42″N 76°20′26″W

Physical characteristics
- Source
  - location: plateau in Davidson Township, Sullivan County, Pennsylvania
  - elevation: 2,240 to 2,260 feet (680 to 690 m)
- Mouth
  - location: Sullivan Branch in Davidson Township, Sullivan County, Pennsylvania
  - elevation: 1,624 ft (495 m)
- Length: 0.5 mi (0.80 km)
- Basin size: 0.5 mi^{2} (1.3 km^{2})

Basin features
- Progression: Sullivan Branch → East Branch Fishing Creek → Fishing Creek → Susquehanna River

Hunts Run is a tributary of Sullivan Branch in Sullivan County, Pennsylvania, in the United States. It is approximately 0.5 miles (0.80 km) long and flows through Davidson Township. Its watershed has an area of 0.40 square miles (1.0 km^{2}). The stream has a low pH and poor water quality. The main rock formations in the area are the Huntley Mountain Formation, and the Burgoon Sandstone. The main soil associations in the vicinity of the stream are the Deep-Wellsboro-Oquaga association, the Morris association, and the Oquaga association.

== Course ==
Hunts Run begins on a plateau in Davidson Township. It begins flowing east and almost immediately enters a valley, where it flows downhill very steeply. After a short distance, it reaches its confluence with Sullivan Branch.

Hunts Run joins Sullivan Branch 1.68 miles (2.70 km) upstream of its mouth.

== Hydrology ==
Hunts Run experiences chronic acidification. During both average flow conditions and high flow conditions, the water quality of the stream is "severe", a rating worse than "very poor". Its pH is less than 4.

Hunts Run is considered by the Pennsylvania Department of Environmental Protection to be impaired by atmospheric deposition due to metals and pH. It was first recognized as impaired in 2002 and as of December 2011, the total maximum daily load date is 2015.

== Geography and geology ==
The elevation near the mouth of Hunts Run is 1,624 feet (495 m) above sea level. The elevation of the stream's source is between 2,240 feet (680 m) and 2,260 feet (690 m).

The headwaters of Hunts Run are on Burgoon Sandstone. The rest of the stream flows over rock of the Huntley Mountain Formation.

The lower reaches of Hunts Run are on soil of the Deep-Wellsboro-Oquaga soil association. The middle reaches of the stream are on rock outcroppings. The upper reaches are on soil of the Oquaga soil association, the Morris soil association, and various minor soil associations. Most of the soils that the stream flows on are strongly acidic.

== Watershed ==
The watershed of Hunts Run has an area of 0.40 square miles (1.0 km^{2}). There are 0.5 miles (0.80 km) of streams in the watershed.

A waterfall known as the Hunts Run falls is situated on Hunts Run. It is a cascade-over-falls type waterfall with a height of 30 feet (9.1 m).

A hiking trail passes near the lower reaches of Hunts Run.

Hunts Run is designated for use by aquatic life.

== See also ==
- List of tributaries of Fishing Creek (North Branch Susquehanna River)
- Ore Run
- Pigeon Run
