= Big Run (East Branch Fishing Creek tributary) =

Coordinates: 41°20′11″N 76°20′23″W

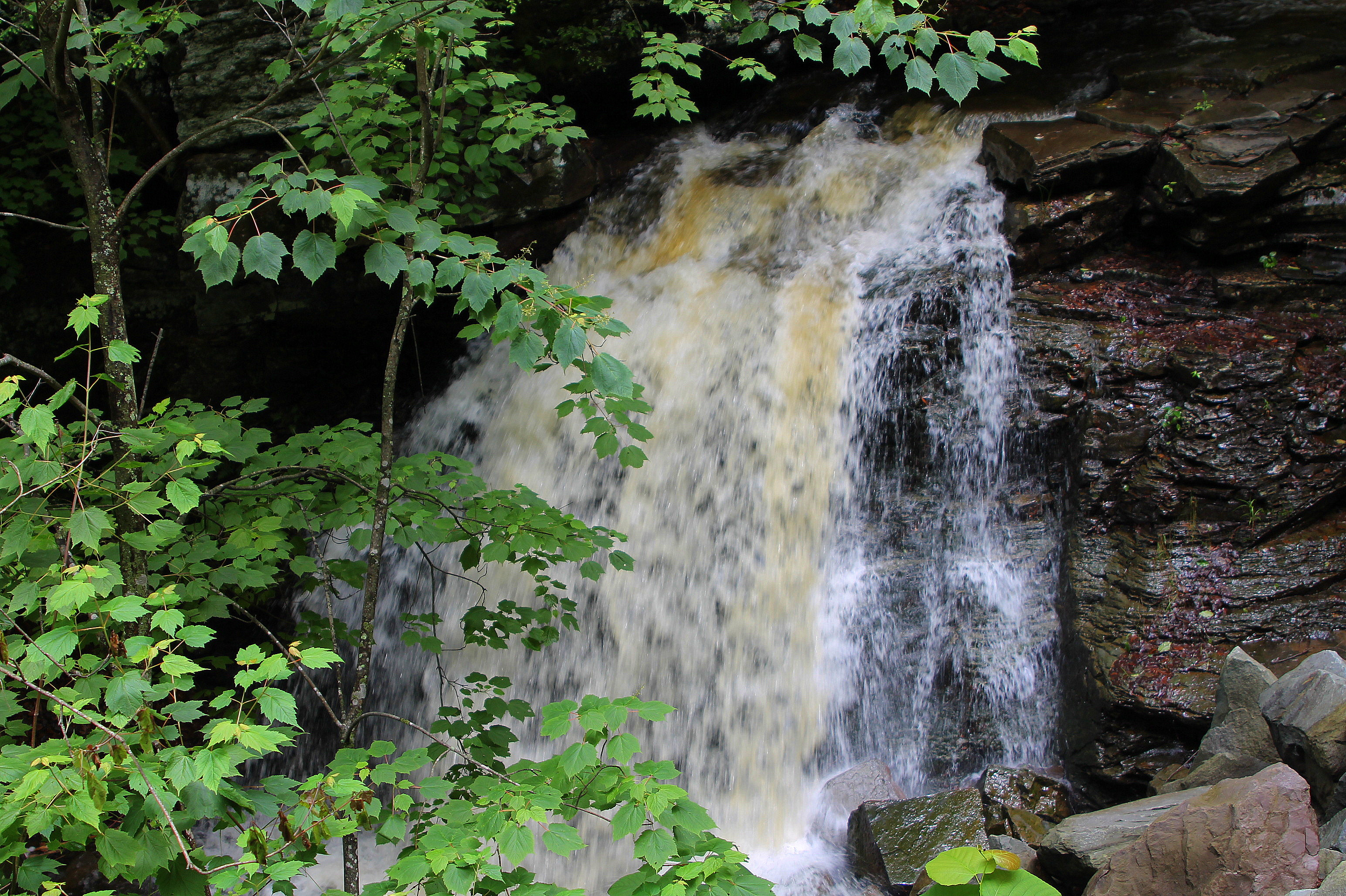
- Big Run Falls

Physical characteristics
- Source
  - location: eastern Davidson Township, Sullivan County, Pennsylvania
  - elevation: 2,240 to 2,260 feet (680 to 690 m)
- Mouth
  - location: East Branch Fishing Creek in Davidson Township, Sullivan County, Pennsylvania
  - elevation: 1,358 ft (414 m)
- Length: 2.4 mi (3.9 km)
- Basin size: 1.38 mi^{2} (3.6 km^{2})
- Discharge
  - average: 1,404 US gal/min (5.31 m^{3}/min)

Basin features
- Progression: East Branch Fishing Creek → Fishing Creek → Susquehanna River → Chesapeake Bay

Big Run is a tributary of East Branch Fishing Creek in Sullivan County, Pennsylvania, in the United States. It is approximately 2.4 miles (3.9 km) long and flows through Davidson Township. Its watershed has an area of 1.38 square miles (3.6 km^{2}). The stream has a low pH and poor water quality, although that could potentially be remedied. The main rock formations in the area are the Catskill Formation, the Huntley Mountain Formation, and the Burgoon Sandstone. The main soil associations in the vicinity of the stream are the Deep-Wellsboro-Oquaga association, the Oquaga association, and the Norwich association.

== Course ==
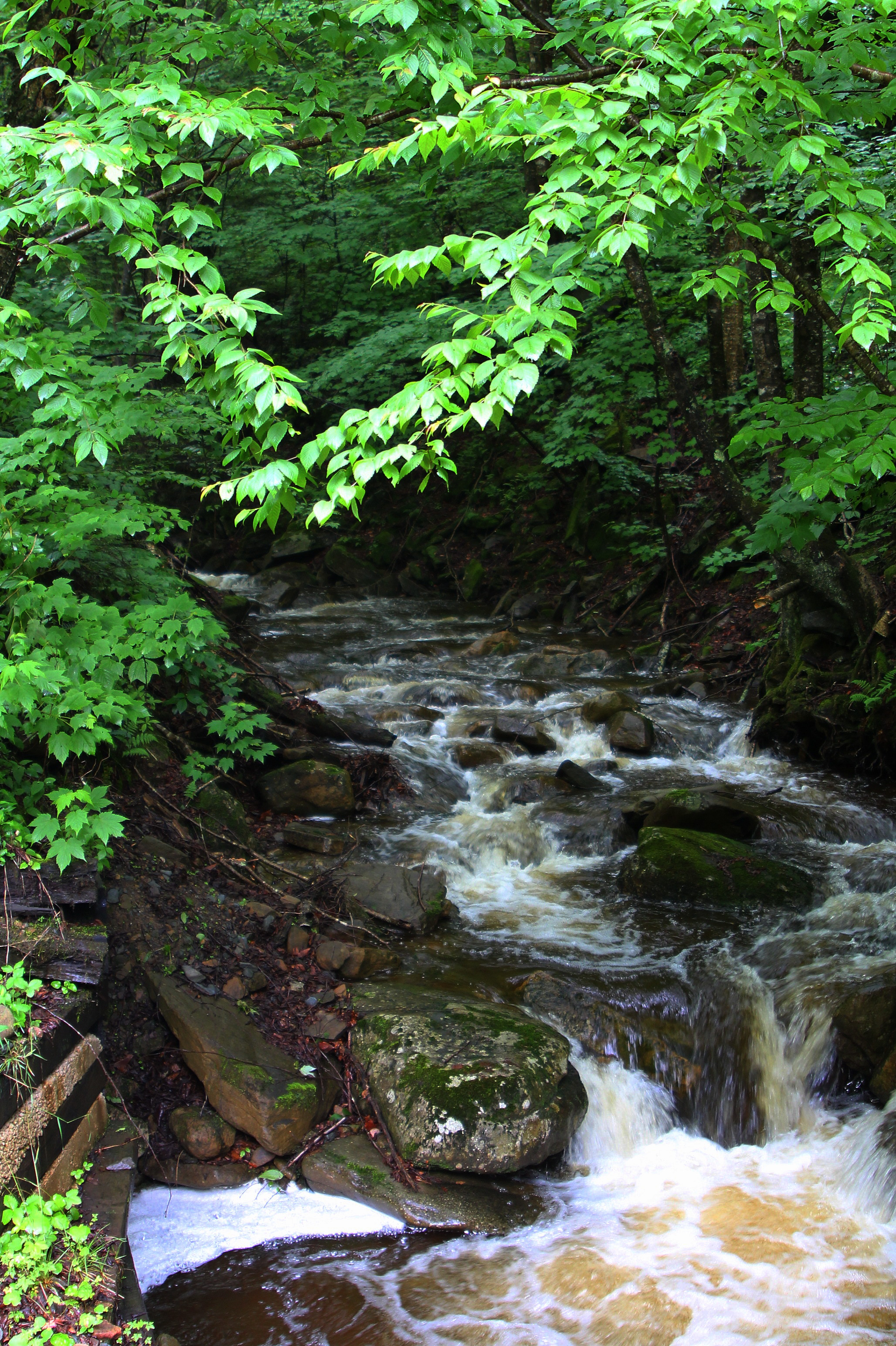
Big Run looking upstream above the falls

Big Run begins in eastern Davidson Township. It flows east for a short distance, nearly reaching the border between Sullivan County and Luzerne County. It then turns north, entering a valley. Once inside the valley, the stream turns west and then southwest, as the valley gets deeper. After less than a mile, the stream turns northwest and leaves the valley. It then merges with Sullivan Branch to form East Branch Fishing Creek.

=== Tributaries ===
Big Run has two unnamed tributaries. These are known as Unt 28011 and Unt 28012. Both are considered by the Pennsylvania Department of Environmental Protection to be impaired by atmospheric deposition.

== Hydrology ==
The average discharge of Big Run is 1404 gallons per minute. The average concentration of aluminum in the stream is 0.167 milligrams per liter.

The pH of Big Run during average flow conditions is 5.61. Its pH ranges from less than 3 to nearly 7. The stream experiences episodic acidification.

Big Run is considered to have "good" water quality during average flow conditions, but "severe" water quality during high flow conditions. The stream does not require any additional alkalinity to be restored to the satisfaction of the East Branch Fishing Creek Restoration Plan. Proposed methods of restoring the water quality of Big Run include in-stream limestone sand dosing and road liming.

== Geography and geology ==
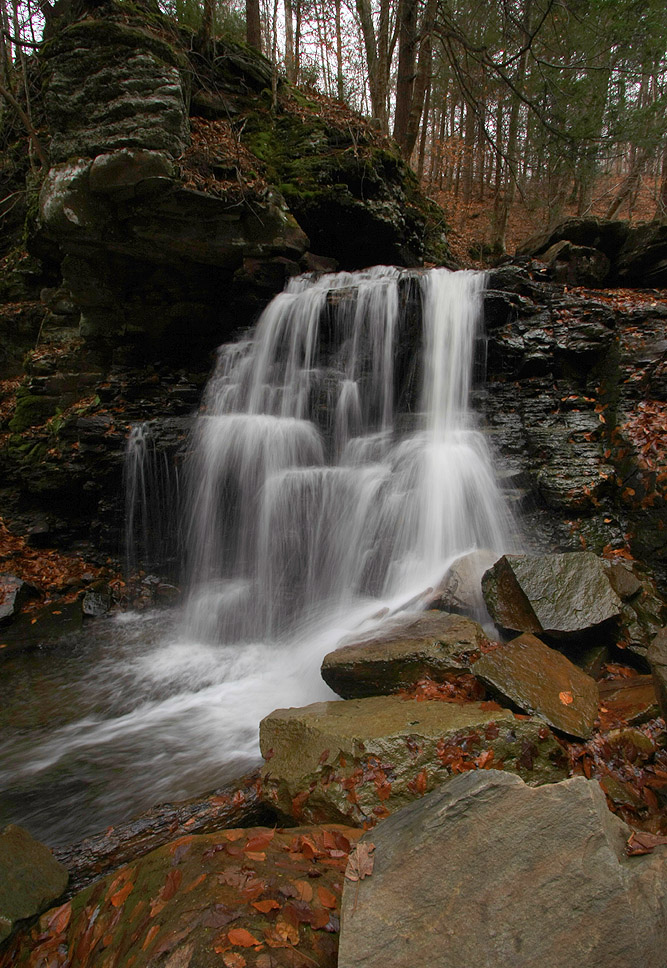
Roadside waterfall on Jamison City Road in State Game Lands 13, Sullivan County

The elevation near the mouth of Big Run is 1,358 feet (414 m) above sea level. The elevation of the stream's source is between 2,240 feet (680 m) and 2,260 feet (690 m).

The area near the mouth of Big Run is on the rock of the Catskill Formation. Most of the rest of the stream is on rock of the Huntley Mountain Formation, but its headwaters are on Burgoon Sandstone.

Most of Big Run is on the soil of the Deep-Wellsboro-Oquaga soil association. However, the headwaters of the stream are on soil of the Oquaga and Norwich associations. Rock outcroppings are also present near the stream. Most of the soils in the watershed are strongly acidic.

== Watershed ==
The watershed of Big Run has an area of 1.38 square miles (3.6 km^{2}). There are 2.5 miles (4.0 km) of streams in the watershed.

Part of Big Run is on private lands.

Big Run and its two unnamed tributaries are designated by the Pennsylvania Department of Environmental Protection for use by aquatic life.

== History ==
The restoration of Big Run is part of the fifth phase of the East Branch Fishing Creek Restoration Plan. This phase of the plan is estimated to cost $200,000.

Big Run was listed as by the Pennsylvania Department of Environmental Protection as impaired in 2002. As of December 2011, a total maximum daily load is scheduled for the stream in 2015.

== See also ==
- Heberly Run
- List of tributaries of Fishing Creek (North Branch Susquehanna River)
