= Ore Run =

Physical characteristics
- Source
  - location: Davidson Township, Sullivan County, Pennsylvania
- Mouth
  - location: Sullivan Branch in Davidson Township, Sullivan County, Pennsylvania
  - coordinates: 41°21′17″N 76°20′39″W
  - elevation: 1,893 ft (577 m)
- Length: 0.9 mi (1.4 km)
- Basin size: 0.78 sq mi (2.0 km^{2})
- Discharge
  - average: 481 US gallons per minute (0.0303 m^{3}/s)

Basin features
- Progression: Sullivan Branch → East Branch Fishing Creek → Fishing Creek → Susquehanna River → Chesapeake Bay

Ore Run is a tributary of Sullivan Branch in Sullivan County, Pennsylvania, in the United States. It is approximately 0.9 miles (1.4 km) long and flows through Davidson Township. Its watershed has an area of 0.78 square miles (2.0 km^{2}). The stream has a low pH and poor water quality. The main rock formations in the area are the Huntley Mountain Formation and the Burgoon Sandstone. The main soil associations in the vicinity of the stream are the Deep-Wellsboro-Oquaga association, and the Oquaga association.

== Course ==
Ore Run begins in Davidson Township, near the northern edge of the East Branch Fishing Creek watershed. It flows southeast for a short distance, entering a steep valley. The stream then turns southwest and flows down the valley. At the bottom of the valley, it reaches its confluence with Sullivan Branch.

=== Tributaries ===
Ore Run has one small, unnamed tributary. It is known as Unt 28017.

== Hydrology ==
The discharge of Ore Run during average flow conditions is 481 gallons per minute. The pH of the stream during average flow conditions is 4.32. The pH ranges from 4 to less than 4.5. The concentration of aluminum during average flow conditions is 0.366 milligrams per liter.

Ore Run experiences chronic acidification. During average flow conditions, the water quality of the stream is "severe", a rating worse than "very poor". It also has this level of water quality during high flow conditions. The stream requires an additional alkalinity load of 27 pounds (12 kg) per day to be restored to the satisfaction of the East Branch Fishing Creek Restoration Plan.

Ore Run is considered by the Pennsylvania Department of Environmental Protection to be impaired by atmospheric deposition due to metals and pH, as is its unnamed tributary.

== Geography and geology ==
The elevation near the mouth of Ore Run is 1,893 feet (577 m) above sea level.

The lower reaches of Ore Run flow over rock of the Huntley Mountain Formation. The upper reaches of the stream flow over rock of the Burgoon Sandstone formation. Rock outcroppings are present in the watershed. The entire length of the stream flows over soil of the Deep-Wellsboro-Oquaga soil association, except for the headwaters, which are on soil of the Oquaga and another, minor soil association. Most of these soils are highly acidic.

There is a bed of iron ore on Ore Run.

== Watershed ==
The watershed of Ore Run has an area of 0.78 square miles (2.0 km^{2}). Ore Run is difficult to access.

The Ore Run Falls are a cascade and slide waterfall on Ore Run. They are 23 feet (7.0 m) high.

Ore Run is designated for use by aquatic life.

== History ==
The restoration of Ore Run is part of the fourth phase of the East Branch Fishing Creek Restoration Plan. This phase is estimated to cost $400,000, making it the most expensive phase of the restoration plan. The stream was first listed by the Pennsylvania Department of Environmental Protection as impaired in 2002. The total maximum daily load date is 2015.

== See also ==
- Hunts Run
- List of tributaries of Fishing Creek (North Branch Susquehanna River)
