= Blackberry Run =

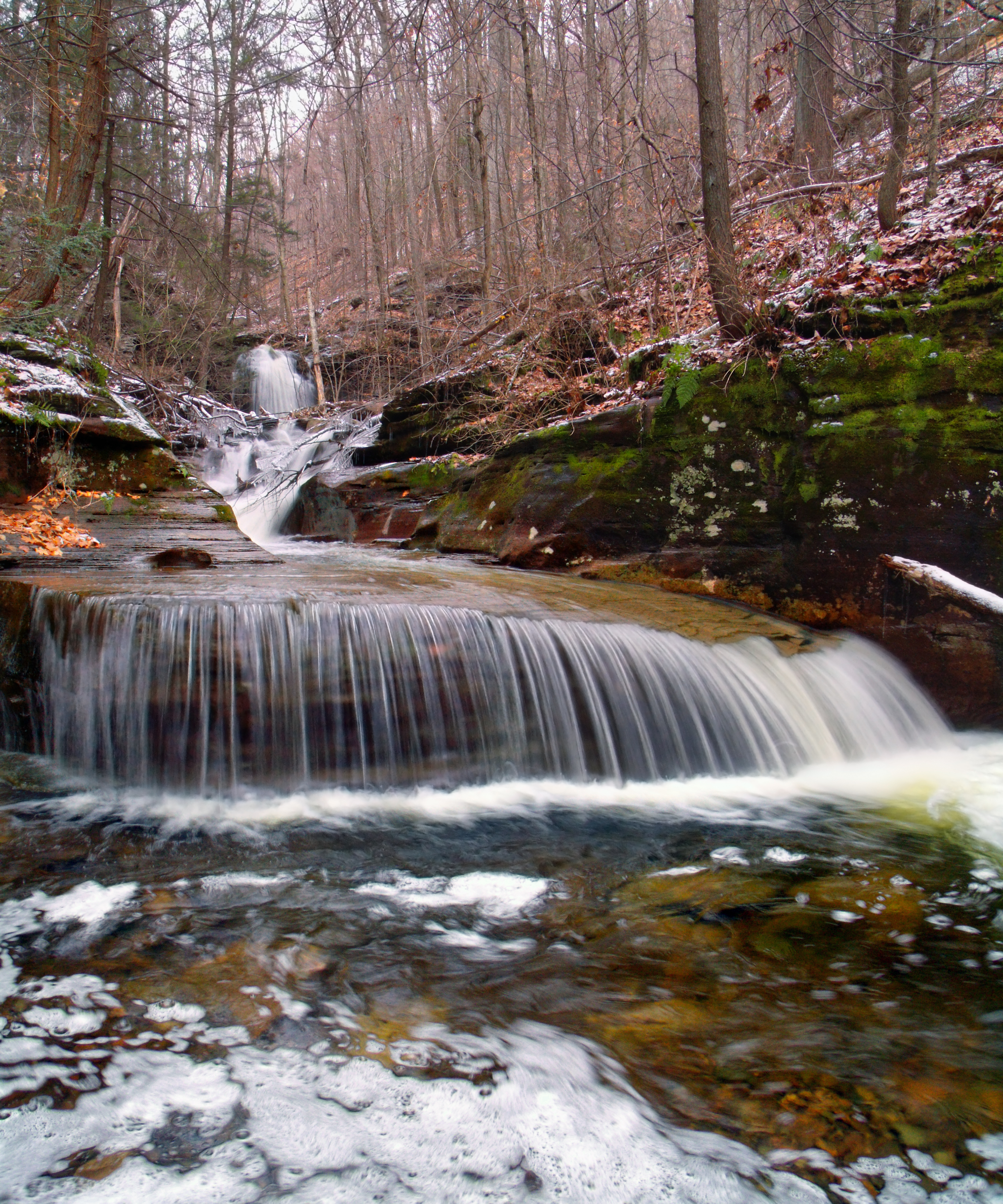

Physical characteristics
- Source
  - location: plateau in Davidson Township, Sullivan County, Pennsylvania
  - elevation: 2,260 ft (690 m)
- Mouth
  - location: East Branch Fishing Creek in Davidson Township, Sullivan County, Pennsylvania
  - coordinates: 41°18′34″N 76°21′17″W
  - elevation: 1,076 ft (328 m)
- Length: 2.5 mi (4.0 km)
- Basin size: 1.91 mi^{2} (4.9 km^{2})
- Discharge
  - average: 2,113 US gal/min (0.1333 m^{3}/s)

Basin features
- Progression: East Branch Fishing Creek → Fishing Creek → Susquehanna River → Chesapeake Bay

Blackberry Run is a tributary of East Branch Fishing Creek in Sullivan County, Pennsylvania, in the United States. It is approximately 2.5 miles (4.0 km) long and flows through Davidson Township. The watershed of the stream has an area of 1.91 square miles (4.9 km^{2}). The stream is acidic and is considered by the Pennsylvania Department of Environmental Protection to be impaired by atmospheric deposition. Rock formations in the watershed include the Catskill Formation and the Huntley Mountain Formation. Soils in the watershed include the Deep-Wellsboro-Oquaga, Wellsboro, and Norwich soil associations.

== Course ==
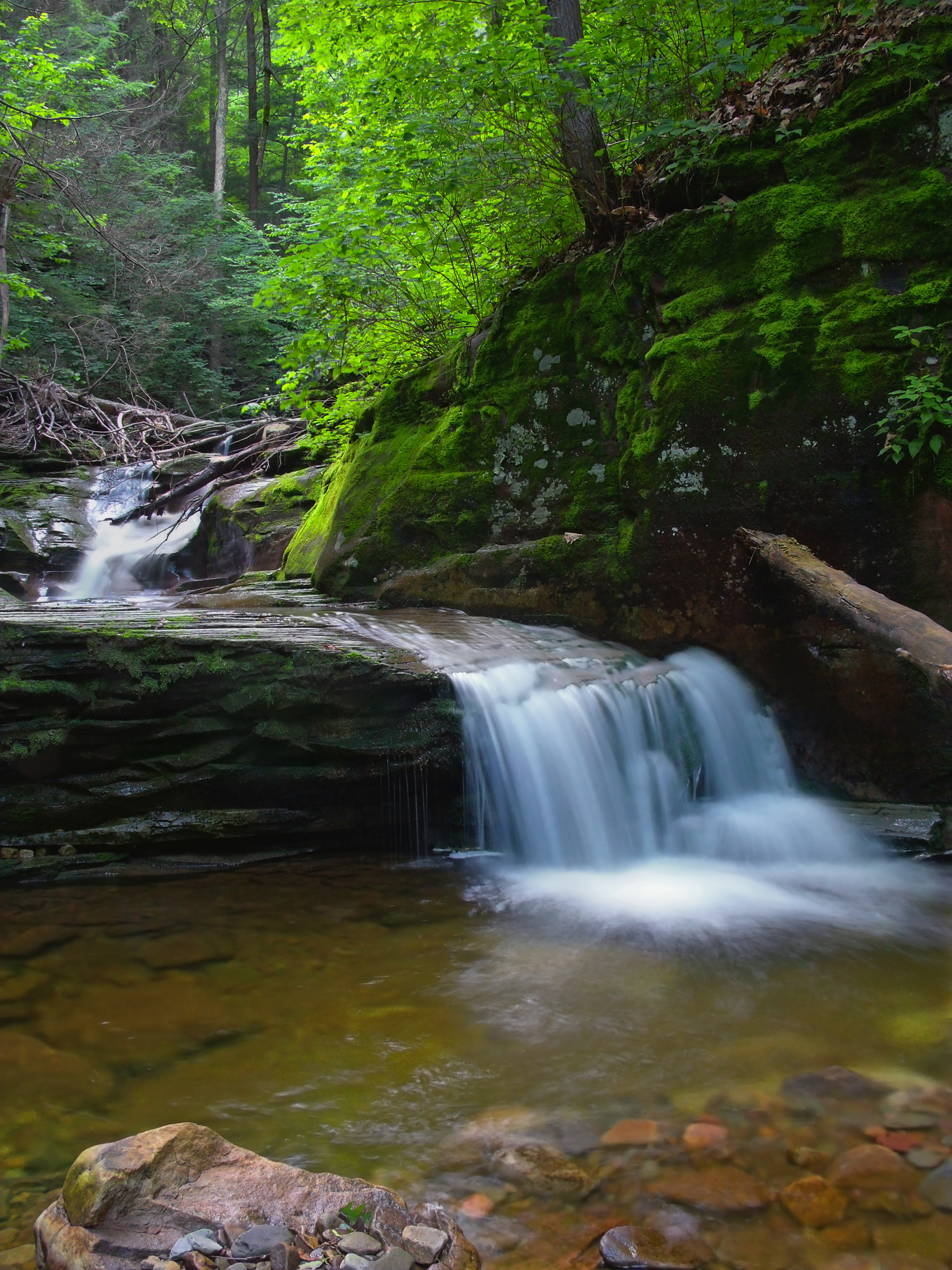
A waterfall on Blackberry Run

Blackberry Run begins on a plateau in Davidson Township. It flows south for a short distance before turning southeast into a deep valley. After some distance, it turns south-southeast, following the valley. It eventually leaves the valley and reaches its confluence with East Branch Fishing Creek near the border between Sullivan County and Columbia County.

Blackberry Run joins East Branch Fishing Creek 3.08 miles (4.96 km) upstream of its mouth. It is the last named tributary to join East Branch Fishing Creek before it reaches its mouth.

=== Tributaries ===
Blackberry Run has no named tributaries. However, it does have at least one small unnamed tributary.

== Hydrology ==
The average discharge of Blackberry Run is 2113 gallons per minute. The pH of the stream averages 4.70. During high flow conditions, it has a pH of 4.72 or 4.74.

Blackberry Run experiences chronic acidification. However, it does not degrade the water quality of East Branch Fishing Creek as significantly as the creek's tributaries further upstream do.

The water quality of Blackberry Run is considered to be "severe" during high-flow conditions, a rating worse than "very poor", which the stream is rated as in normal flow conditions. Blackberry Run requires an additional 66 pounds (30 kg) of alkalinity per day to be restored to satisfaction of the East Branch Fishing Creek Restoration Plan. One proposed method of increasing the alkalinity of the stream is the construction of vertical flow wetlands at its headwaters. Other proposed methods include road liming and high flow buffer channels.

Blackberry Run is designated by the Pennsylvania Department of Environmental Protection for use by aquatic life. However, the stream is considered to be impaired due to atmospheric deposition.

== Geography and geology ==
The elevation near the mouth of Blackberry Run is 1,076 feet (328 m) above sea level. The source of the stream is approximately 2,260 feet (690 m) above sea level.

The lower half of Blackberry Run flows over rock of the Catskill Formation. Further upstream, the stream flows over the Huntley Mountain Formation. The stream's upper reaches are on the Burgoon Sandstone.

The lower portion of Blackberry Run flows through soil of the Deep-Wellsboro-Oquaga soil association and the upper reaches of the stream are on soil of the Wellsboro soil association. Soil associations such as the Norwich association occur near the stream as well. Its mouth is on a minor soil association. All of the soil near the stream is strongly acidic.

Rock outcroppings are present in the vicinity of Blackberry Run. These outcroppings are made of shale and sandstone.

== Watershed ==
The watershed of Blackberry Run has an area of 1.91 square miles (4.9 km^{2}). There are 2.9 miles (4.7 km) of streams in the watershed.

Most of Blackberry Run is surrounded by Pennsylvania State Game Lands. There is a forested trail near the stream.

== History ==
Blackberry Run was used as a water supply for industrial and domestic uses, in particular, for the residents of Jamison City, in the early 1900s. Part of the stream was closed to fishing in 1920. A large tannery operated on the stream in the past.

The restoration of Blackberry Run is the third phase of the East Branch Fishing Creek Restoration Plan. This restoration plan could potentially restore up to 2.4 miles (3.9 km) of Blackberry Run. The cost of restoring the stream is estimated to be $200,000.

Blackberry Run was listed as impaired by the Pennsylvania Department of Environmental Protection in 2002. As of December 2011, a total maximum daily load is scheduled for 2015.

== Biology ==
Great-spurred violet plants have been observed near Blackberry Run. The stream is designated as a high-quality coldwater fishery.

== See also ==
- List of tributaries of Fishing Creek (North Branch Susquehanna River)
- Trout Run (East Branch Fishing Creek)
