= Quinn Run =

Coordinates: 41°20′18″N 76°21′52″W

Physical characteristics
- Source
  - location: northern Davidson Township, Sullivan County, Pennsylvania
  - elevation: 2,280 to 2,300 feet (690 to 700 m)
- Mouth
  - location: Heberly Run in Davidson Township, Sullivan County, Pennsylvania
  - elevation: 1,466 ft (447 m)
- Length: 2.3 mi (3.7 km)
- Basin size: 2.31 sq mi (6.0 km^{2})
- Discharge
  - average: 1,111 US gallons per minute (0.0701 m^{3}/s)

Basin features
- Progression: Heberly Run → East Branch Fishing Creek → Fishing Creek → Susquehanna River → Chesapeake Bay
- Tributaries
  - left: Shanty Run

Quinn Run is a tributary of Heberly Run in Sullivan County, Pennsylvania. It is approximately 2.3 miles (3.7 km) long and flows through Davidson Township, Sullivan County, Pennsylvania. The watershed of the stream has an area of 2.31 square miles (6.0 km^{2}). The stream is acidic and is considered by the Pennsylvania Department of Environmental Protection to be impaired by atmospheric deposition. Rock formations in the watershed include the Huntley Mountain Formation and the Burgoon Sandstone. Soils in the watershed include the Deep-Wellsboro-Oquaga soil association, and the Oquaga and Norwich soil associations. There are some waterfalls on the stream.

== Course ==
Quinn Run begins in northern Davidson Township. It flows southeast for a short distance before turning south and entering a valley. After some distance, the stream turns east-southeast and receives the tributary Shanty Run. Approximately 0.4 miles (0.64 km) further downstream, Quinn Run reaches its confluence with Heberly Run just upstream of Lewis Falls.

Quinn Run reaches its confluence with Heberly Run 1.40 miles (2.25 km) upstream of its mouth.

== Hydrology ==
During average flow conditions, the discharge of Quinn Run is 1111 gallons per minute. The concentration of aluminum in the stream is 0.114 milligrams per liter during average flow conditions and the pH is 5.75.

Quinn Run experiences episodic acidification. However, it is not extremely deficient in alkalinity.

Quinn Run has "good" water quality during average flow conditions and "very poor" water quality during high flow conditions. However, several methods have been proposed to improve its water quality by increasing alkalinity. These methods include the addition of vertical flow wetlands at the stream's headwaters, forest surface liming, and road liming.

Quinn Run is considered by the Pennsylvania Department of Environmental Protection to be impaired by atmospheric deposition due to pH.

== Geography and geology ==
The elevation near the mouth of Quinn Run is 1,466 feet (447 m) above sea level. The elevation of the stream's source is between 2,280 feet (690 m) and 2,300 feet (700 m).

Most of Quinn Run is on rock of the Huntley Mountain Formation. However, the stream's upper reaches are on rock of the Burgoon Sandstone formation. There are some rock outcroppings in the watershed.

Most of Quinn Run flows over soil of the Deep-Wellsboro-Oquaga soil association. However, its upper reaches are on soil of the Oquaga association and the Morris association. These soils are all highly acidic.

== Watershed ==
The watershed of Quinn Run has an area of 2.31 square miles (6.0 km^{2}). The stream is entirely on Pennsylvania State Game Lands. There are also a number of waterfalls on the stream.

No part of Quinn Run is accessible by road. However, the stream can be accessed using a four-wheel drive. An old tram road also goes up the stream's valley.

Quinn Run is designated by the Pennsylvania Department of Environmental Protection for use by aquatic life.

== History ==
Together with its tributary Shanty Run, the restoration of Quinn Run is the second phase of the East Branch Fishing Creek Restoration Plan. This phase is estimated to cost $300,000, making it the second most expensive phase of the restoration plan.

== See also ==
- List of tributaries of Fishing Creek (North Branch Susquehanna River)
- Meeker Run
