= Meeker Run =

Coordinates: 41°20′50″N 76°23′14″W

Physical characteristics
- Source
  - location: plateau in Davidson Township, Sullivan County, Pennsylvania
  - elevation: 2,360 to 2,380 feet (720 to 730 m)
- Mouth
  - location: Heberly Run in Davidson Township, Sullivan County, Pennsylvania
  - elevation: 1,935 ft (590 m)
- Length: 0.9 mi (1.4 km)
- Basin size: 0.41 sq mi (1.1 km^{2})
- Discharge
  - average: 320 US gallons per minute (0.020 m^{3}/s)

Basin features
- Progression: Heberly Run → East Branch Fishing Creek → Fishing Creek (North Branch Susquehanna River) → Susquehanna River → Chesapeake Bay
- Tributaries
  - left: Unt 28006

Meeker Run is a tributary of Heberly Run in Sullivan County, Pennsylvania, in the United States. It is approximately 0.9 miles (1.4 km) long and flows through Davidson Township. Its watershed has an area of 0.41 square miles (1.1 km^{2}). The stream has a low pH, although that could potentially be remedied. The main rock formations in the area are the Huntley Mountain Formation and the Burgoon Sandstone. The main soil associations in the vicinity of the stream are the Deep-Wellsboro-Oquaga association, the Wellsboro association, the Norwich association, and the Oquaga association.

== Course ==
Meeker Run begins on a plateau in Davidson Township. It flows south for a short distance before turning east and flowing into a valley. Along the way, it receives an unnamed tributary. At the end of the valley, it reaches its confluence with Heberly Run.

Meeker Run joins Heberly Run 2.93 miles (4.72 km) upstream of its mouth.

=== Tributaries ===
Meeker Run has an unnamed tributary known as Unt 28006.

== Hydrology ==
Meeker Run has a discharge of 320 gallons per minute during average flow conditions. The pH of the stream during average flow conditions is 4.37 and the concentration of aluminum is 0.260 milligrams per liter. It experiences chronic acidification.

The water quality of Meeker Run is considered to be "severe" (a rating worse than "very poor") in both average and high flow conditions. However, the stream only significantly affects the water quality of Heberly Run during high flow conditions.

To be restored to the satisfaction of the East Branch Fishing Creek Restoration Plan, Meeker Run requires an additional alkalinity load of 16 pounds (7.3 kg) per day. Proposed methods of adding alkalinity to the stream include forest surface liming, as this is the only feasible method, given the difficulty of accessing the stream.

A total of 0.96 miles (1.54 km) of Meeker Run and 0.55 miles (0.89 km) of its unnamed tributary are considered by the Pennsylvania Department of Environmental Protection to be impaired by atmospheric deposition due to pH and metals.

The concentration of dissolved organic carbon near the headwaters of Meeker Run is 15.0 milligrams per liter. This is nearly twice as high as any other studied stream in the watershed of East Branch Fishing Creek.

== Geography and geology ==
The elevation near the mouth of Meeker Run is 1,935 feet (590 m) above sea level. The elevation of the stream's source is between 2,360 feet (720 m) and 2,380 feet (730 m) above sea level.

The lower reaches of Meeker Run are on rock of the Huntley Mountain Formation and the upper reaches are on Burgoon Sandstone. Below its unnamed tributary, the stream flows over soil of the Deep-Wellsboro-Oquaga soil association. Upstream of this confluence, it flows over such soil associations as the Wellsboro association, the Oquaga association, and the Norwich association. Another minor soil association is found near its headwaters. Most of the soil in the watershed is strongly acidic.

== Watershed ==
The watershed of Meeker Run has an area of 0.41 square miles (1.1 km^{2}). There are 1.2 miles (1.9 km) of streams in the watershed of Meeker Run.

Wetlands such as marshes and fens are located in the upper reaches of the Meeker Run watershed. There is a tannic bog on a tributary of the stream.

Meeker Run can only be accessed using a four wheel drive.

== History ==
The restoration of Meeker Run is part of the first phase of the East Branch Fishing Creek Restoration Plan. This phase, which also includes Heberly Run, is estimated to cost $230,000.

Meeker Run was first listed as an impaired stream in 2002. As of December 2011 total maximum daily load is scheduled for it in 2015.

== Biology ==
The macroinvertebrate community of Meeker Run is considered to be the worst of several streams in the watershed of East Branch Fishing Creek.

== See also ==
- List of tributaries of Fishing Creek (North Branch Susquehanna River)
- Quinn Run
