= Pigeon Run (Sullivan Branch) =

Coordinates: 41°20′28″N 76°20′08″W

Physical characteristics
- Source
  - location: eastern Davidson Township, Sullivan County, Pennsylvania
  - elevation: 2,300 to 2,320 feet (700 to 710 m)
- Mouth
  - location: Sullivan Branch in Davidson Township, Sullivan County, Pennsylvania
  - elevation: 1,489 ft (454 m)
- Length: 1.3 mi (2.1 km)
- Basin size: 0.78 mi^{2} (2.0 km^{2})
- Discharge
  - average: 636 US gallons per minute (0.0401 m^{3}/s)

Basin features
- Progression: Sullivan Branch → East Branch Fishing Creek → Fishing Creek → Susquehanna River → Chesapeake Bay

Pigeon Run is a tributary of Sullivan Branch in Sullivan County, Pennsylvania, in the United States. It is approximately 1.3 miles (2.1 km) long and flows through Davidson Township. Its watershed has an area of 0.78 square miles (2.0 km^{2}). The stream has a low pH and sometimes has poor water quality, although that could potentially be remedied. The main rock formations in the area are the Catskill Formation, the Huntley Mountain Formation, and the Burgoon Sandstone. The main soil associations in the vicinity of the stream are the Deep-Wellsboro-Oquaga association, the Norwich association, the Morris association, and the Oquaga association.

== Course ==
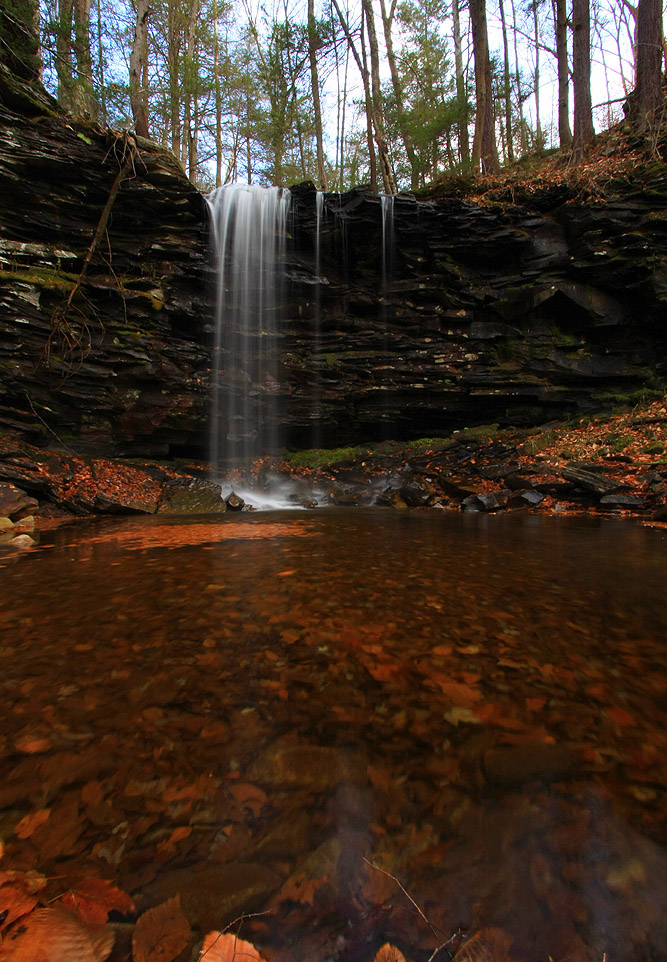
Lowest fall on Pigeon Run as it meets Sullivan Run. State Game Lands 13, Sullivan County.

Pigeon Run begins in eastern Davidson Township, not far from the border between Sullivan County and Luzerne County. It flows south for some distance before entering a very steep valley. Approximately halfway down the valley, the stream turns southwest. It reaches its confluence with Sullivan Branch at the end of the valley.

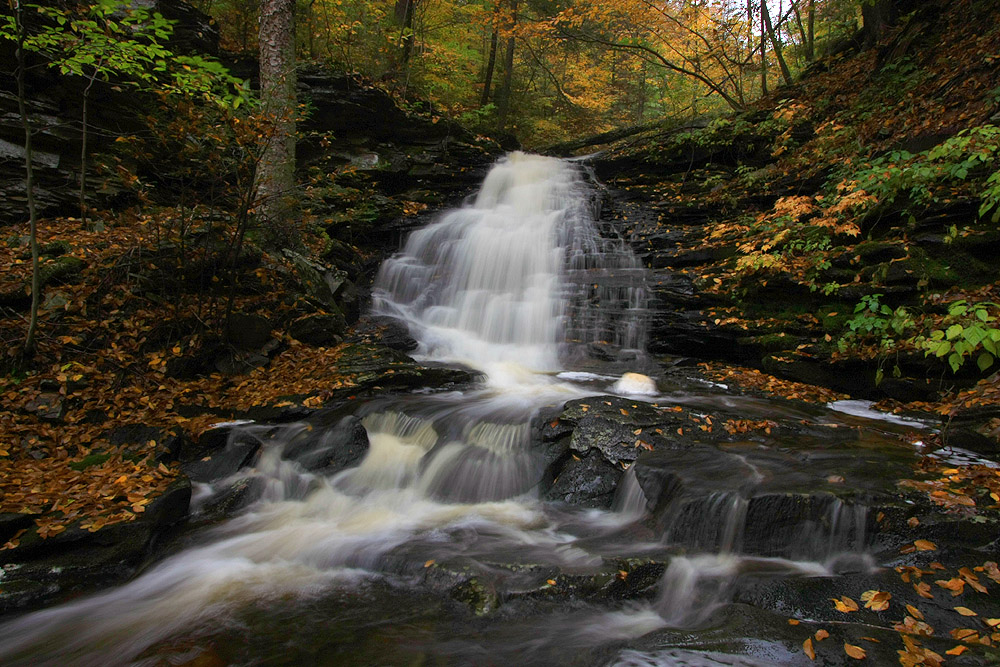
One of a handful of waterfalls found upstream from the lowest fall on Pigeon Run. State Game Lands 13, Sullivan County.

== Hydrology ==
During average flow conditions, the discharge of Pigeon Run is 636 gallons per minute. Its pH ranges from less than 4 to over 6, but is 5.11 during average flow conditions. The concentration of aluminum in the stream is 0.219 milligrams per liter during average flow conditions.

Pigeon Run experiences chronic acidification. The stream has "fair" water quality during average flow conditions, but "very poor" water quality during high flow conditions. It requires an additional alkalinity load of 7 pounds (3.2 kg) per day to be restored to the satisfaction of the East Branch Fishing Creek Restoration Plan. Proposed methods of increasing alkalinity include vertical flow wetlands and road liming.

Pigeon Run is considered by the Pennsylvania Department of Environmental Protection to be impaired by atmospheric deposition due to metals and pH.

== Geography and geology ==
The elevation of Pigeon Run near its mouth is 1,489 feet (454 m) above sea level. The elevation of the source is between 2,300 feet (700 m) and 2,320 feet (710 m) above sea level.

The mouth of Pigeon Run is over rock of the Catskill Formation. Further upstream, it flows over rock of the Huntley Mountain Formation. The stream's upper reaches are on Burgoon Sandstone.

Soil associations in the vicinity of Pigeon Run include the Deep-Wellsboro-Oquaga association in the lower reaches and the Oquaga association, the Norwich association, and the Morris association in the upper reaches. All of these soils are highly acidic. There are also some rock outcroppings near the stream.

There is a bed of iron ore on Pigeon Run.

== Watershed ==
The watershed of Pigeon Run has an area of 0.78 square miles (2.0 km^{2}). There are 1.3 miles (2.1 km) up streams in its watershed.

Pigeon Run can only be accessed by hiking. A trail crosses the stream.

Pigeon Run is designated by the Pennsylvania Department of Environmental Protection for use by aquatic life.

Pigeon Run has a waterfall known as Pigeon Run Falls.

== History ==
The restoration of Pigeon Run is the fourth phase of the East Branch Fishing Creek Restoration Plan. This phase, which also includes the upper reaches of Sullivan Branch and some of its other tributaries, is estimated to cost $400,000, making it the most expensive phase of the restoration plan.

Pigeon Run was first listed by the Pennsylvania Department of Environmental Protection as impaired in 2002. As of December 2011, a total maximum daily load is scheduled for 2015.

== See also ==
- List of tributaries of Fishing Creek (North Branch Susquehanna River)
