= Lead Run =

River in Pennsylvania, United States

Coordinates: 41°19′14″N 76°20′37″W

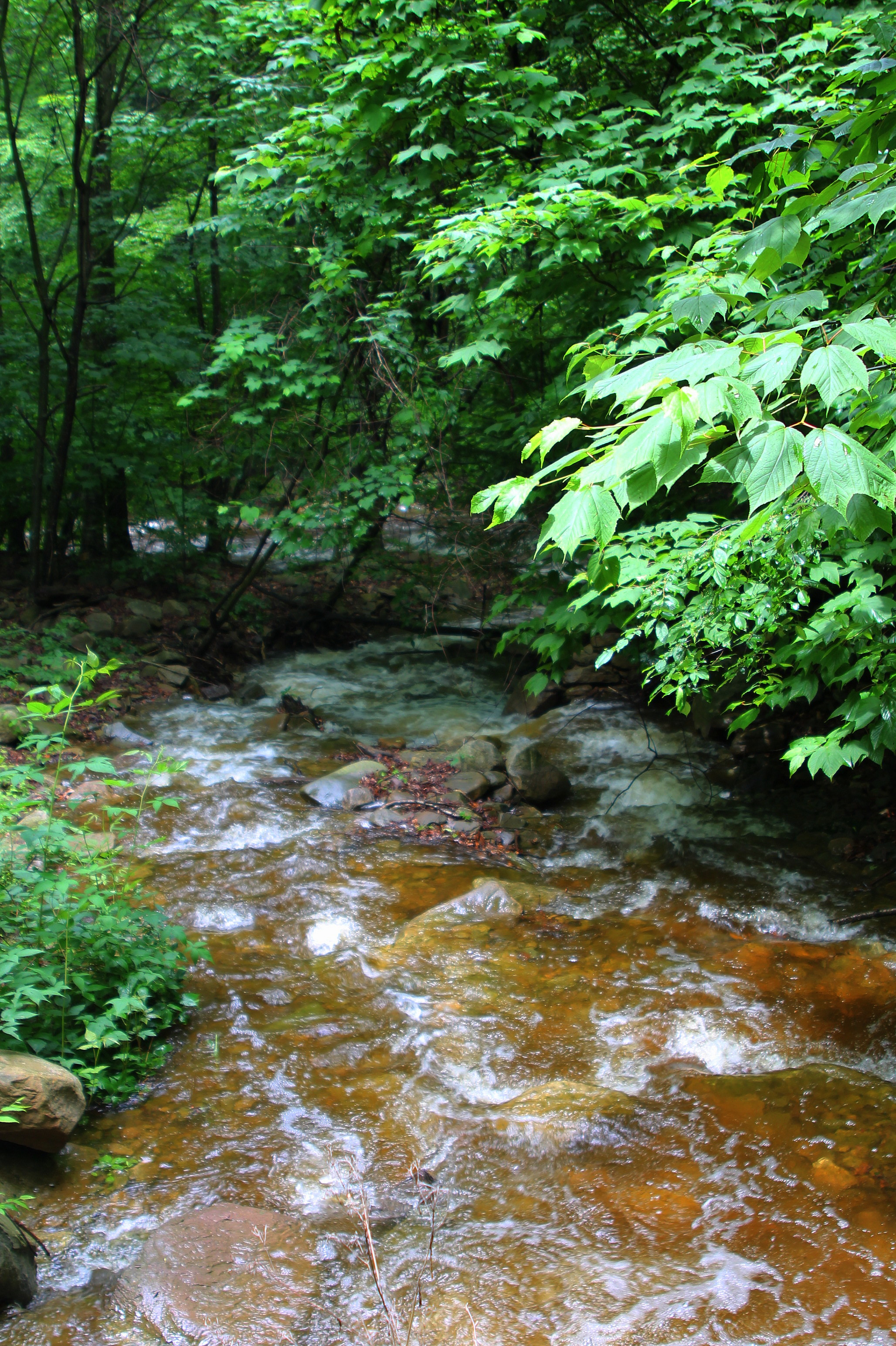
- Lead Run looking downstream

Physical characteristics
- Source
  - location: plateau in eastern Davidson Township, Sullivan County, Pennsylvania
  - elevation: 2,260 to 2,280 feet (690 to 690 m)
- Mouth
  - location: East Branch Fishing Creek in Davidson Township, Sullivan County, Pennsylvania
  - elevation: 1,155 ft (352 m)
- Length: 1.5 mi (2.4 km)
- Basin size: 0.82 sq mi (2.1 km^{2})
- Discharge
  - average: 821 US gallons per minute (0.0518 m^{3}/s)

Basin features
- Progression: East Branch Fishing Creek → Fishing Creek → Susquehanna River → Chesapeake Bay

Lead Run is a tributary of East Branch Fishing Creek in Sullivan County, Pennsylvania. It is approximately 1.5 miles (2.4 km) long and flows through Davidson Township. Its watershed has an area of 0.82 square miles (2.1 km^{2}). The stream has a low pH and poor water quality, although that could potentially be remedied. The main rock formations in the area are the Catskill Formation, the Huntley Mountain Formation, and the Burgoon Sandstone. The main soil associations in the vicinity of the stream are the Deep-Wellsboro-Oquaga association, the Norwich association, and the Oquaga association.

== Course ==
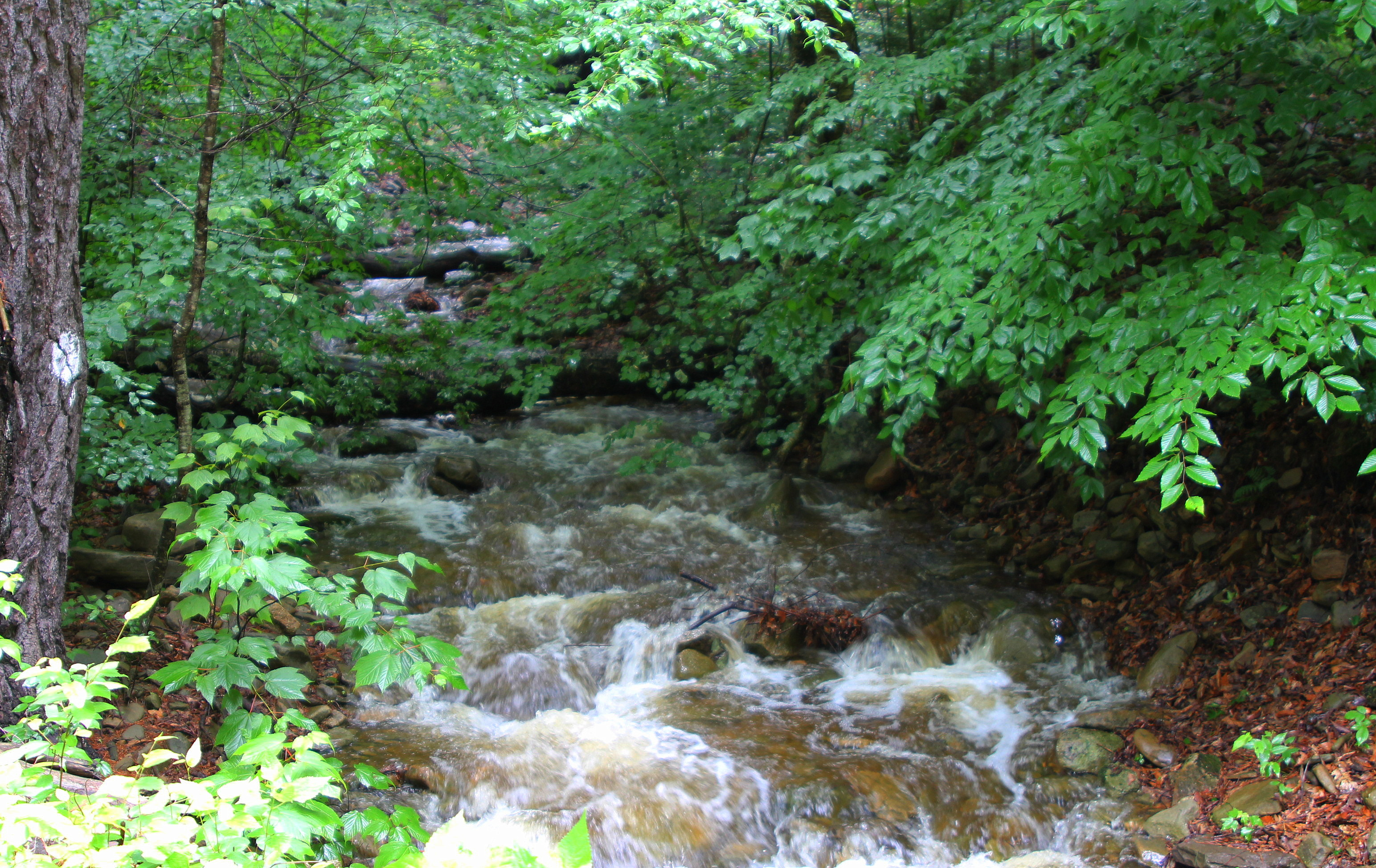
Lead Run looking upstream

Lead Run begins in on a plateau in eastern Davidson Township. It flows west-northwest for approximately 0.2 miles (0.32 km) before turning southwest and heading into a steep ravine, where it stays for more than a mile. Near its mouth, the stream leaves the ravine and turns south and then east. It then reaches its confluence with East Branch Fishing Creek.

Lead Run joins East Branch Fishing Creek 4.12 miles (6.63 km) upstream of its mouth.

=== Tributaries ===
Lead Run has no named tributaries. However, it does have a number of unnamed tributaries.

== Hydrology ==
The average discharge of Lead Run is 821 gallons per minute. However, it occasionally runs dry for a period of time, especially during the summer. The average pH of the stream is 4.44. The average concentration of aluminum in the stream is 0.301 milligrams per liter.

The average alkaline deficiency of Lead Run is 19 pounds (8.6 kg) per day. The stream experiences chronic acidification.

The water quality of Lead Run is considered to be "severe", a rating worse than "very poor". The stream also degrades the water quality of East Branch Fishing Creek, although it is not a major contributor of acidity to the creek. Road liming has been suggested as a method of making Lead Run more alkaline. The cost of road liming Lead Run along with the nearby Trout Run is estimated to be $120,000. This restoration is the seventh and final phase of the restoration plan of East Branch Fishing Creek.

A total of 1.84 miles (2.96 km) of streams (the entirety of every stream in the watershed of Lead Run) are considered to be impaired. The cause of the impairment is atmospheric deposition and metals.

== Geography and geology ==
The elevation near the mouth of Lead Run is 1,155 feet (352 m) above sea level. The elevation of the stream's source is between 2,260 feet (690 m) and 2,280 feet (690 m).

The lower reaches of Lead Run lie over rock of the Catskill Formation. The middle portion of the stream is on rock of the Huntley Mountain Formation. The stream's headwaters are on Burgoon Sandstone.

Much of Lead Run is over soil of the Deep-Wellsboro-Oquaga soil association. However, the upper reaches of the watershed are on soil of the Norwich and Oquaga soil associations. Most of the soil in the watershed is strongly acidic. There are also some rock outcroppings near the stream.

== Watershed ==
The watershed of Lead Run has an area of 0.82 square miles (2.1 km^{2}). There are approximately 1.8 miles (2.9 km) of streams in the watershed.

Most of Lead Run is located along private lands. However, a number of forest trails run parallel to and cross the stream.

== History ==
The Pennsylvania Department of Environmental Protection listed Lead Run as impaired in 2002. As of December 2011, a total maximum daily load is planned for the stream in 2015.

== See also ==
- Heberly Run
- List of tributaries of Fishing Creek (North Branch Susquehanna River)
