= Trout Run (East Branch Fishing Creek tributary) =

Coordinates: 41°18′52″N 76°20′53″W

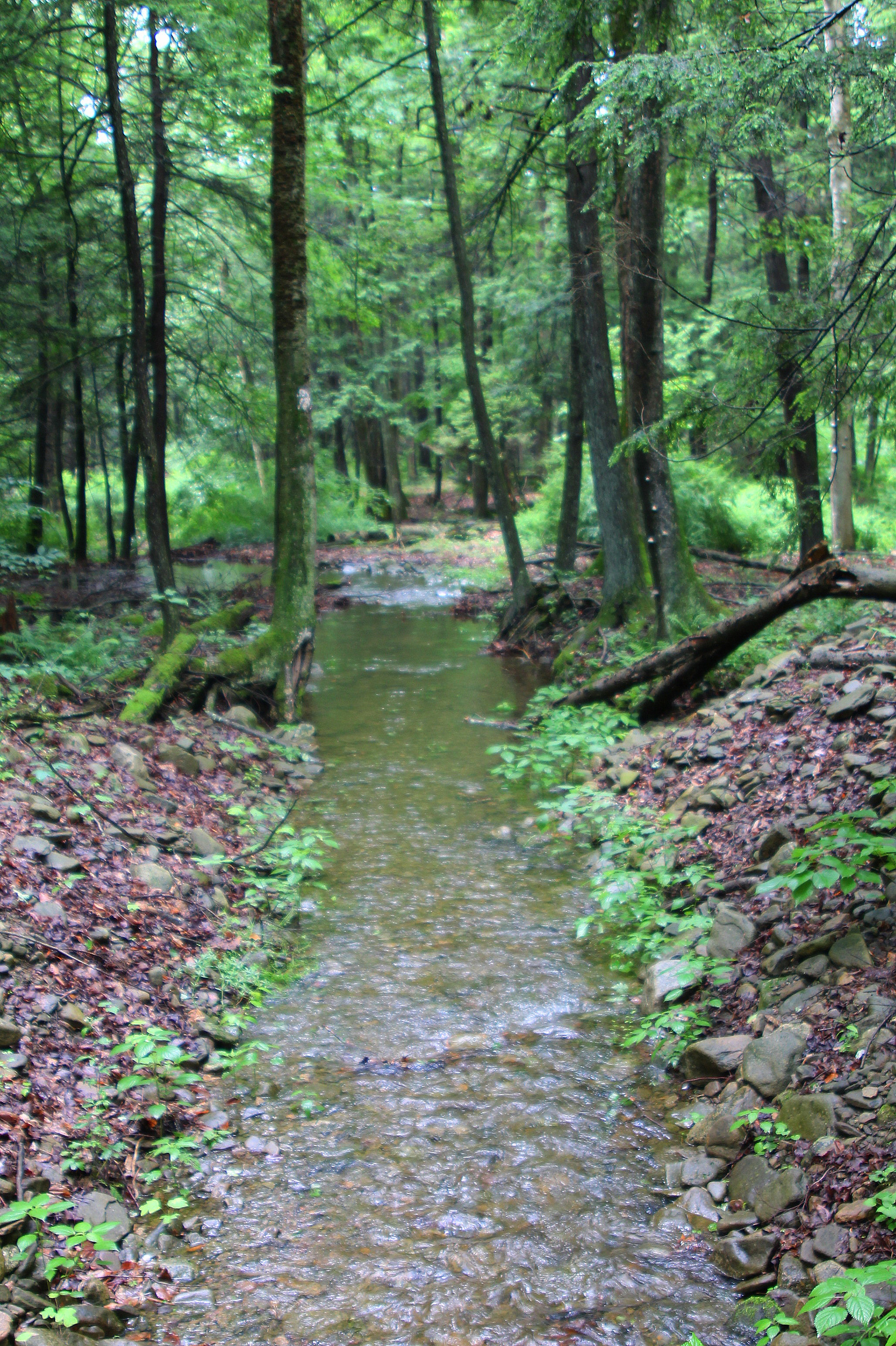
- Trout Run looking downstream

Physical characteristics
- Source
  - location: plateau in Davidson Township, Sullivan County, Pennsylvania
  - elevation: 2,240 to 2,260 feet (680 to 690 m)
- Mouth
  - location: East Branch Fishing Creek in Davidson Township, Sullivan County, Pennsylvania
  - elevation: 1,112 ft (339 m)
- Length: 1.5 mi (2.4 km)
- Basin size: 0.62 sq mi (1.6 km^{2})
- Discharge
  - average: 930 US gal/min (2.1 cu ft/s; 0.059 m^{3}/s)

Basin features
- Progression: East Branch Fishing Creek → Fishing Creek → Susquehanna River → Chesapeake Bay

Trout Run is a tributary of East Branch Fishing Creek in Sullivan County, Pennsylvania, in the United States. It is approximately 1.5 miles (2.4 km) long and flows through Davidson Township. The watershed of the stream has an area of 0.62 square miles (1.6 km^{2}). The stream is acidic and is considered by the Pennsylvania Department of Environmental Protection to be impaired by atmospheric deposition and metals. Rock formations in the watershed include the Catskill Formation and the Huntley Mountain Formation. Soils in the watershed include the Deep-Wellsboro-Oquaga and Oquaga soil associations.

== Course ==
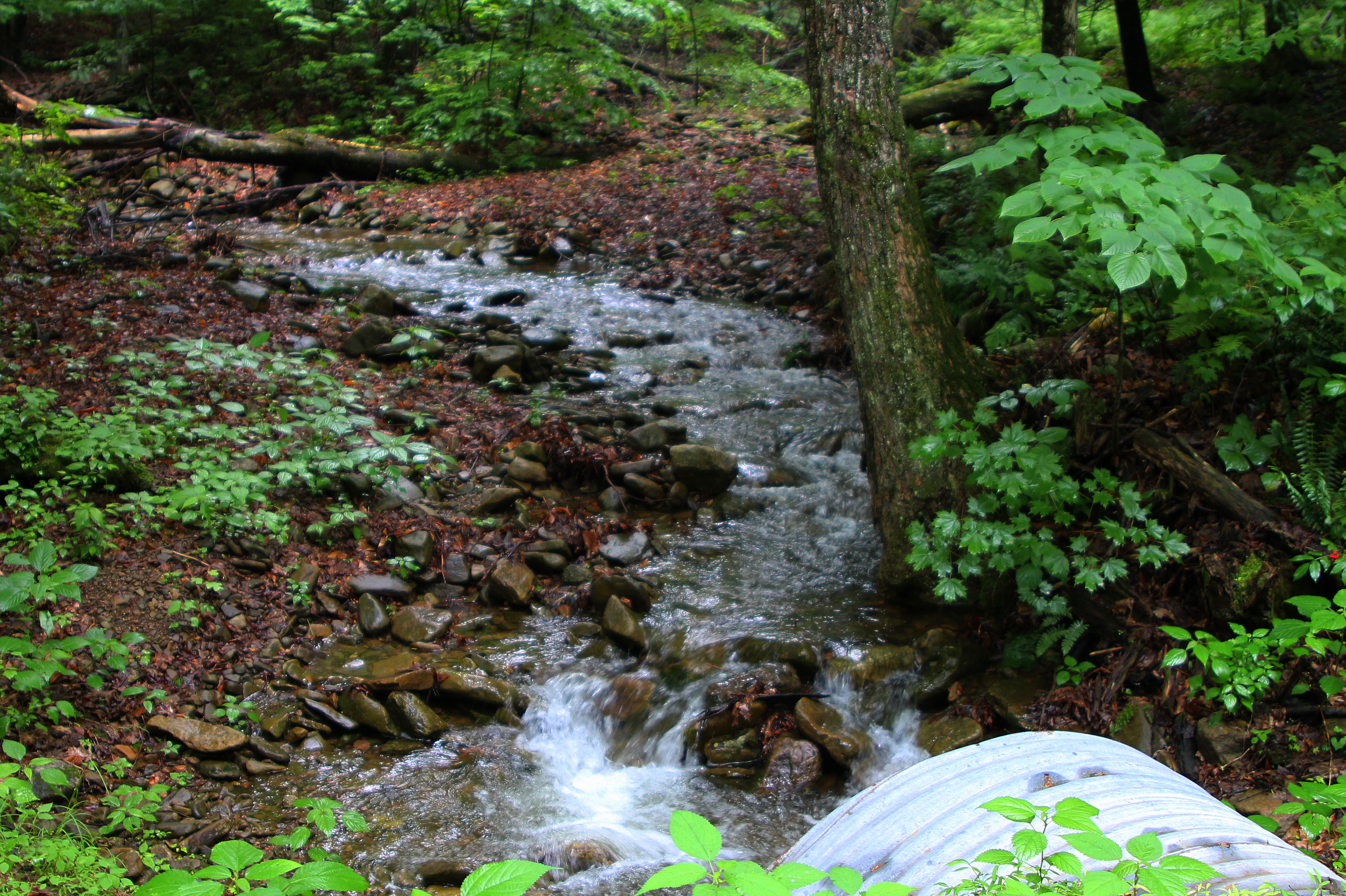
Trout Run looking upstream

Trout Run begins on a plateau in Davidson Township. It flows west-northwest for a short distance before turning southwest and entering a valley, which it flows through for some distance. At the end of the valley, the stream turns southwest and then south. After a short distance, it reaches its confluence with East Branch Fishing Creek.

Trout Run joins East Branch Fishing Creek 3.60 miles (5.79 km) upstream of its mouth.

=== Tributaries ===
Trout Run has no named tributaries. It does, however, have at least one small unnamed tributary.

== Hydrology ==
The average discharge of Trout Run is 930 gallons per minute. It sometimes runs dry. The concentration of aluminum in the stream is 9.9 milligrams per liter during average conditions.

The pH of Trout Run is 5.29 during average conditions. The stream experiences episodic acidification. It requires an additional alkalinity load of 8 pounds (3.6 kg) per day to be restored to the standards laid out by the East Branch Fishing Creek Restoration Plan.

Trout Run is considered to have fair water quality. It could potentially improve the water quality of East Branch Fishing Creek, but not significantly. Proposed methods of increasing the alkalinity of Trout Run include road liming. The cost of road liming Trout Run along with the nearby Lead Run is estimated to be $120,000.

A total of 1.8 miles (2.9 km) of streams in the watershed of Trout Run are considered by the Pennsylvania Department of Environmental Protection to be impaired to do atmospheric deposition and metals.

== Geography and geology ==
The elevation near the mouth of Trout Run is 1,112 feet (339 m) above sea level. The elevation of the source of the stream is between 2,240 feet (680 m) and 2,260 feet (690 m).

The lower reaches of Trout Run are over rock of the Catskill Formation. The stream's upper reaches lie over the Huntley Mountain Formation.

The lower reaches of Trout Run lie over the Oquaga soil association, although the Deep-Wellsboro-Oquaga soil association also occurs nearby. The upper reaches of the stream have soils of the Oquaga soil association, as well as another soil association. There are also rock outcroppings near the stream. Most of the soil in the watershed is highly acidic.

== Watershed ==
The watershed of Trout Run has an area of 0.62 square miles (1.6 km^{2}). There are 1.8 miles (2.9 km) of streams in the watershed.

Most of Trout Run is on private land. However, a number of forest trails run parallel to and cross the stream.

== History ==
The restoration of Trout Run, along with Lead Run, is the seventh phase of the East Branch Fishing Creek Restoration Plan. The Pennsylvania Department of Environmental Protection has designated Trout Run to be used for aquatic life. The stream was listed as impaired in 2002. As of December 2011, a total maximum daily load is scheduled for it in 2015.

== See also ==
- Blackberry Run
- Lead Run
- List of tributaries of Fishing Creek (North Branch Susquehanna River)
