= Rockwell Run =

Coordinates: 39°36′44″N 78°22′20″W

Rockwell Run is a mountain stream in Morgan County, West Virginia. It is a tributary of the Potomac River.

The Rockwell Formation is named after Rockwell Run, where exposures of the formation were first described by Stose and Swartz in 1912.

== See also ==
- List of rivers of West Virginia
