= Rockwell Formation =

- Stratigraphic range: Late Devonian to Early Mississippian
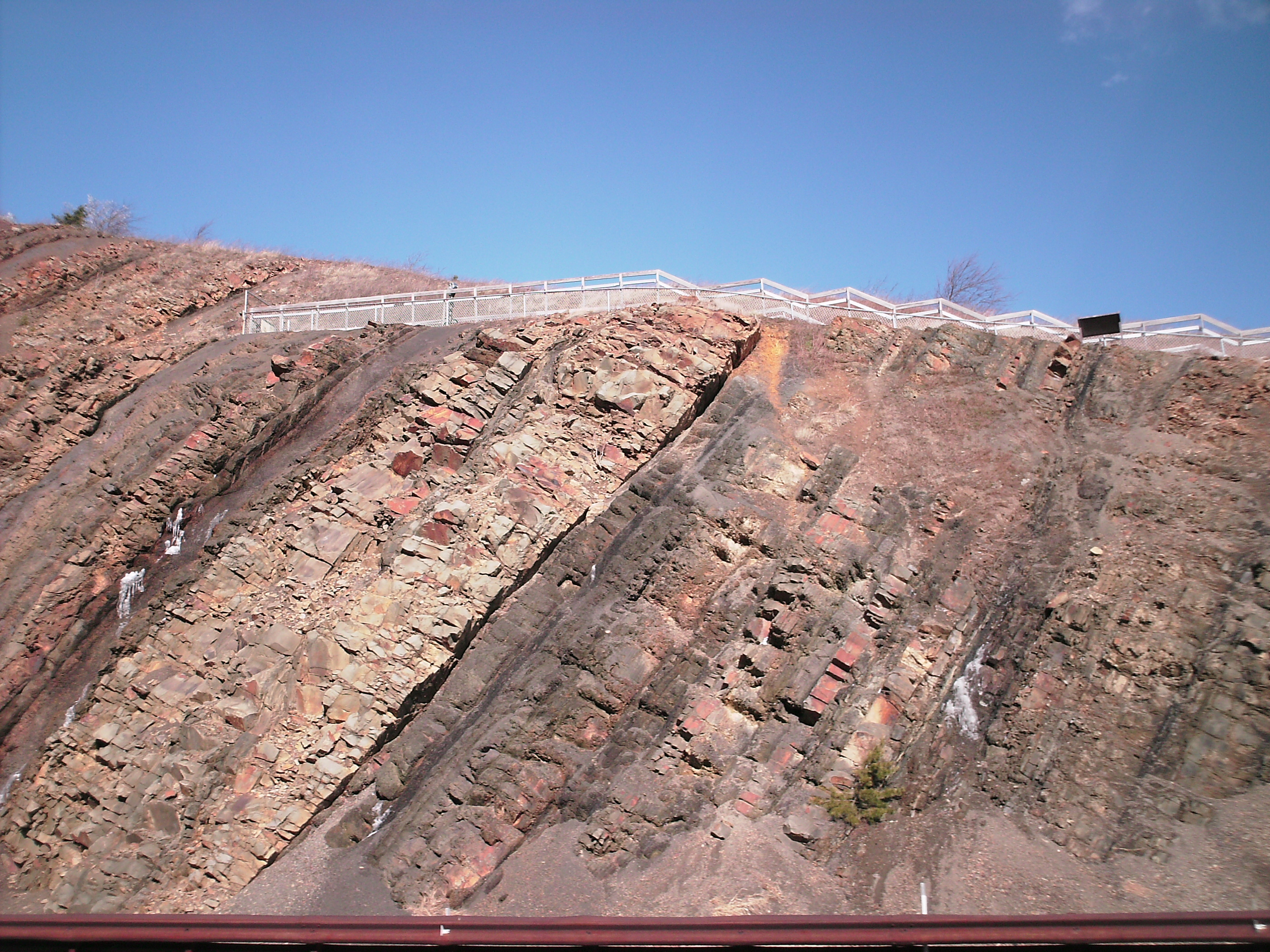
- Rockwell Formation at Sideling Hill, I-68 roadcut
- Type: Sedimentary
- Sub-units: Finzel Tongue, Patton Shale, Riddlesburg Shale
- Underlies: Pocono Formation and Purselane Sandstone
- Overlies: Hampshire Formation
- Thickness: 500 to 540 feet in WV, 540 to 550 feet at Sideling Hill

Lithology
- Primary: Sandstone, shale, conglomerate

Location
- Region: Appalachian Mountains
- Extent: West Virginia, Maryland, Pennsylvania

Type section
- Named for: Rockwell Run, West Virginia
- Named by: Stose and Swartz, 1912

The Rockwell Formation is a late Devonian and early Mississippian mapped bedrock unit in West Virginia, Maryland, and Pennsylvania, in the United States.

== Description ==
The Rockwell Formation was described at its type section at Rockwell Run in West Virginia as soft arkosic sandstone, fine hard conglomerate, and buff hackly shale.

The formation was originally described in West Virginia by Stose and Swartz (1912). It was first described in Maryland by H. E. Vokes (1957), and later described in central Pennsylvania by C. R. Wood (1980).

== Stratigraphy ==
The Rockwell is generally considered a Formation. At Formation rank, it has several members, including the Patton and Riddlesburg Shale Members, and the Finzel Tongue.

It has been reduced in rank to a member of the Price Formation in West Virginia.

The Rockwell is a lateral equivalent of the Huntley Mountain Formation and the Spechty Kopf Formation, as all three underlie the prominent Pocono Formation and its lateral equivalent, the Burgoon Sandstone.

Lessing, Dean, and Kulander (1992) mapped the Meadow Branch synclinorium in Berkeley County, West Virginia, and noted that the Rockwell is approximately 200 meters thick here and that a 2-meter thick diamictite is present near the base.

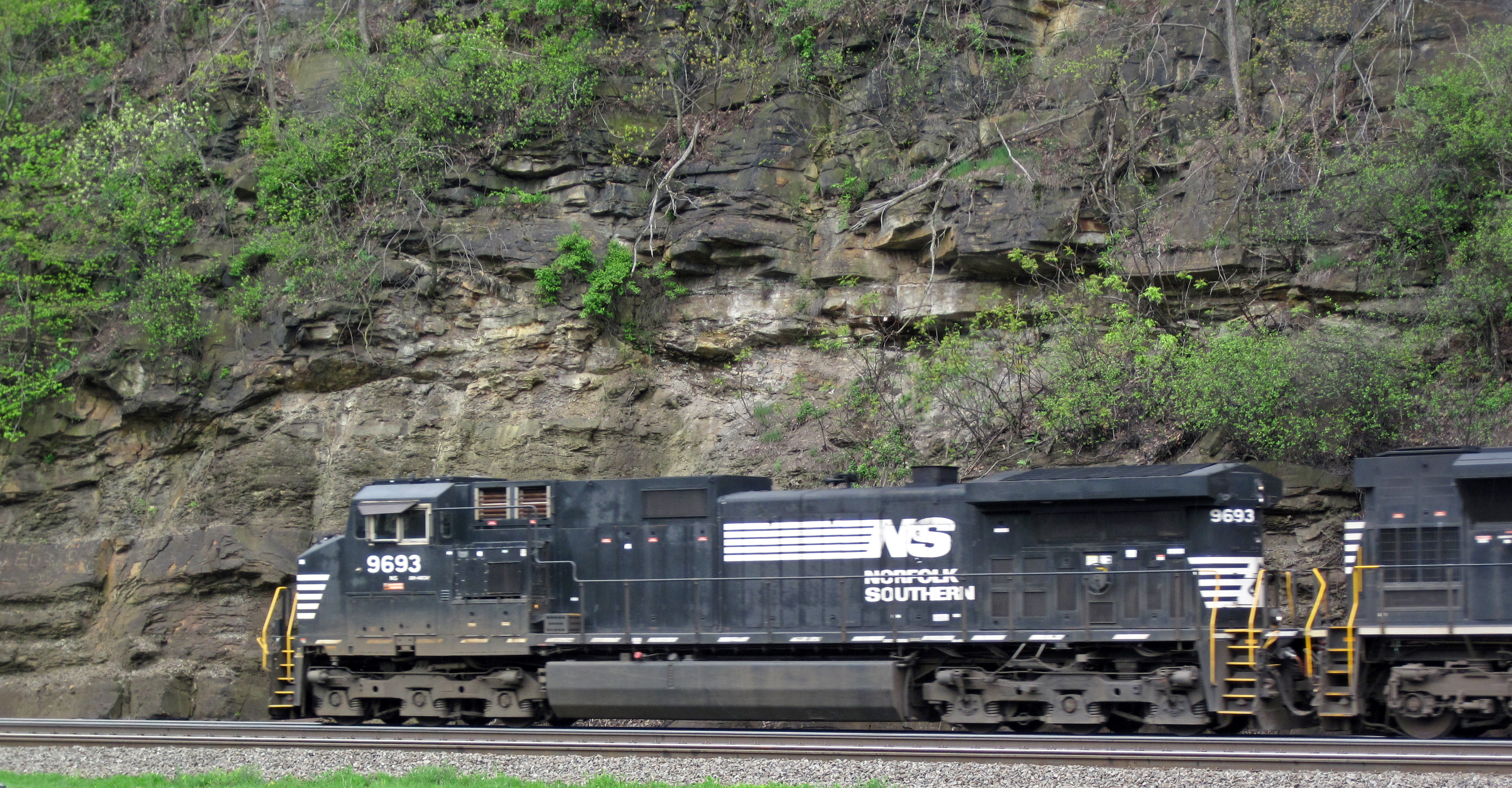
Outcrops of the Rockwell Formation in Pennsylvania (Norfolk Southern Railway, Horseshoe Curve)

== See also ==
- Geology of Pennsylvania
- Huntley Mountain Formation
