= Sullivan Branch =

Coordinates: 41°20′11″N 76°20′23″W

- Location of Sullivan Branch mouth Sullivan Branch (the United States)

Physical characteristics
- Source
  - location: North Mountain in Davidson Township, Sullivan County, Pennsylvania
  - elevation: 2,380 to 2,400 feet (730 to 730 m)
- Mouth
  - location: East Branch Fishing Creek in Davidson Township, Sullivan County, Pennsylvania
  - elevation: 1,340 to 1,360 feet (410 to 410 m)
- Length: 3.3 mi (5.3 km)
- Basin size: 5.81 sq mi (15.0 km^{2})
- Discharge
  - average: 22.735 cu ft/s (0.6438 m^{3}/s)

Basin features
- Progression: East Branch Fishing Creek → Fishing Creek → Susquehanna River → Chesapeake Bay
- Tributaries
  - left: Ore Run, Pigeon Run
  - right: Hunts Run

Sullivan Branch (also known as Sullivan Run or the Sullivan Branch of East Branch Fishing Creek) is a tributary of East Branch Fishing Creek in Sullivan County, Pennsylvania, in the United States. It is approximately 3.3 miles (5.3 km) long and flows through Davidson Township.

Sullivan Branch is acidic, with an average pH ranging from 3.99 to 4.19. The stream contains dissolved oxygen and dissolved aluminum. It also has a large number of waterfalls. The upper reaches of the stream are on North Mountain.

Sullivan Branch is designated as a high-quality coldwater fishery. It is in the Pennsylvania State Game Lands Number 13.

== Course ==
Sullivan Branch begins in northern Davidson Township. It flows east for a short distance before turning southeast and entering a valley. After more than a mile, it receives the tributary Ore Run and turns south-southeast. The valley of the stream is approximately 400 feet (120 m) deep at this point. Eventually, Sullivan Branch receives the tributary Hunts Run and turns southeast. Shortly afterwards, it merges with Big Run to form East Branch Fishing Creek.

=== Tributaries ===
Tributaries of Sullivan Branch include Ore Run, Hunts Run, and Pigeon Run. The watershed of Ore Run has an area of 0.78 square miles (2.0 km^{2}). The watershed of Hunts Run has an area of 0.40 square miles (1.0 km^{2}). The watershed of Pigeon Run has an area of 0.78 square miles (2.0 km^{2}).

== Discharge, aluminum, acidity, and alkalinity ==
The discharge of Sullivan Branch at its headwaters is 3,276,000 gallons per day. The concentration of aluminum in Sullivan Branch at its headwaters is 0.43 milligrams per liter. The daily load of aluminum there is 11.77 pounds (5.34 kg). The averaged acidity and alkalinity at an upstream point, both expressed in units of mg CaCO_{3} per litre, were found to be 7.23 and 5.03 respectively. The daily loads of these substances are 197.74 pounds (89.69 kg) and 137.60 pounds (62.41 kg), respectively.

Downstream of the tributary Ore Run, the discharge of Sullivan Branch is 11,177,000 gallons per day. The aluminum concentration at this point is 0.39 milligrams per liter and the load is 36.50 pounds (16.56 kg) per day. The acidity concentration is 6.70 milligrams per liter and the daily alkalinity load is 624.92 pounds (283.46 kg). The alkalinity concentration is 5.33 milligrams per liter and the daily alkalinity load is 497.45 pounds (225.64 kg).

Downstream of the tributary Pigeon Run, the discharge of Sullivan Branch is 14,693,000 gallons per day. The concentrations of aluminum, acidity, and alkalinity are 0.37, 7.57, and 5.57 milligrams per liter, respectively. The daily load of aluminum is 45.94 pounds (20.84 kg). The load of acidity is 927.78 pounds (420.83 kg) per day and the alkalinity load is 682.55 pounds (309.60 kg) per day.

== Acidity and water quality ==
The pH of Sullivan Branch at its headwaters is 3.99. Below Ore Run, the pH is 4.11 and below Pigeon Run, it is 4.19. The average temperature is 9.1 °C (48.4 °F) at the stream's headwaters, 9.3 °C (48.7 °F) downstream of Ore Run, and 9.4 °C (48.9 °F) below Pigeon Run. At the headwaters of Sullivan Branch, the concentrations of dissolved oxygen and dissolved organic carbon are 10.40 and 3.322 milligrams per liter, respectively. Below Ore Run, the dissolved oxygen concentration is 9.87 milligrams per liter and the concentration of dissolved organic carbon is 3.232 milligrams per liter. Downstream of Pigeon Run, the concentrations of these substance are 10.09 and 3.190 milligrams per liter, respectively. Sullivan Branch experiences chronic acidification throughout.

As of 2011 it was not clear how much the acidity was due to sulfuric acid coming from the atmosphere and how much due to organic acids derived from humic substances.

A total of 5.06 miles (8.14 km) of streams in the watershed of Sullivan Branch are considered to be impaired. This includes parts of all three of its tributaries and its unnamed tributaries. The water quality of the stream is considered to be poor in normal conditions and very poor in high flow conditions. Its water quality is significantly degraded by its tributaries.

== Geography and geology ==
The headwaters of Sullivan Branch are on North Mountain. A plateau separates the stream from another stream known as Heberly Run. The elevation of the stream at its mouth is between 1,340 feet (410 m) and 1,360 feet (410 m) above sea level. The elevation of the stream's source is between 2,380 feet (730 m) and 2,400 feet (730 m) above sea level.

The gradient of Sullivan Branch is about equal to that of Kitchen Creek.

== Watershed ==
The watershed of Sullivan Branch has an area of 5.81 square miles (15.0 km^{2}).

There are at least ten waterfalls on Sullivan Branch, some of which are unnamed. The shapes of these waterfalls include bridal veil falls and wedding cake falls. The highest waterfall is the Fifth Falls, which have a height of 50 feet (15 m). The lowest waterfall is the Tenth Falls, which have a height of 8 feet (2.4 m). Several of the stream's tributaries also have waterfalls on them.

Proposed methods to increase alkalinity in the Sullivan Branch watershed include high flow buffer channels, forest surface liming, in-stream limestone sand dosing, and road liming. The restoration of the stream is estimated to cost $600,000.

Sullivan Branch is described as "the prettiest stream in Pennsylvania" in Scott E. Brown's book Pennsylvania Waterfalls: A Guide for Hikers and Photographers.

== Biology ==
As a tributary of East Branch Fishing Creek, Sullivan Branch is designated as a high-quality coldwater fishery.

Plants found along Sullivan Branch include red trillium, violets of various colors, and squirrel corn. Hobblebush also occurs on the stream's edges.

== Recreation ==
The entirety of Sullivan Branch is in Pennsylvania State Game Lands Number 13. It is possible to hike up the stream, but scrambling is required in some places.

== See also ==
- Heberly Run
- List of tributaries of Fishing Creek (North Branch Susquehanna River)
