= Heberly Run =

Coordinates: 41°19′34″N 76°20′44″W

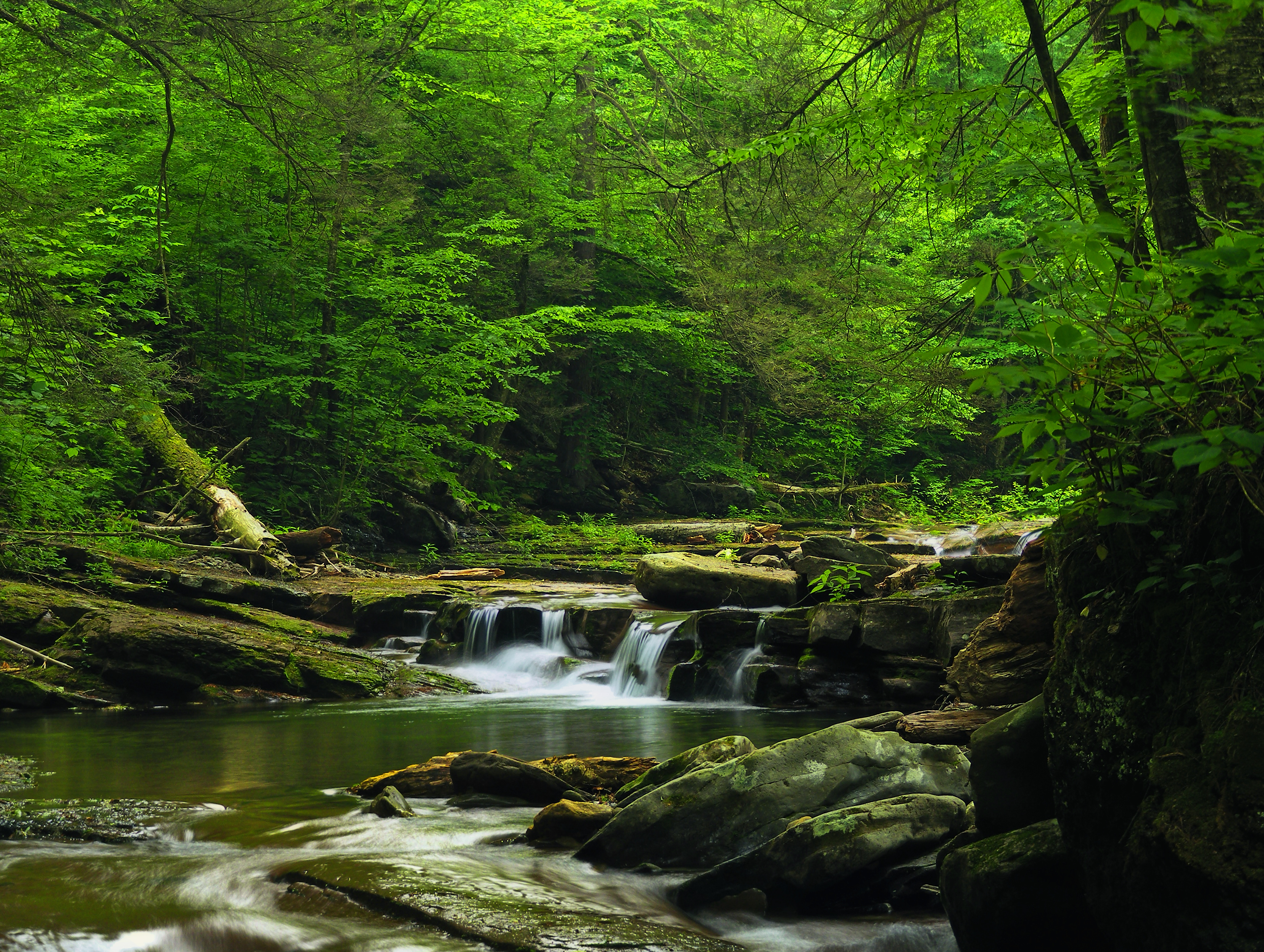
- Heberly Run in Pennsylvania State Game Lands Number 13

Physical characteristics
- Source
  - location: mountain top in Davidson Township, Sullivan County, Pennsylvania
- Mouth
  - location: East Branch Fishing Creek in Davidson Township, Sullivan County, Pennsylvania
  - elevation: 1,187 ft (362 m)
- Length: 4.9 mi (7.9 km)
- Basin size: 6.42 mi^{2} (16.6 km^{2})
- Discharge
  - average: 24,076,000 US gallons per day (37.3 cu ft/s; 1.1 m^{3}/s)

Basin features
- Progression: East Branch Fishing Creek → Fishing Creek → Susquehanna River → Chesapeake Bay
- Tributaries
  - left: Quinn Run
  - right: Meeker Run

Heberly Run is a tributary of East Branch Fishing Creek in Sullivan County, Pennsylvania, in the United States. It is approximately 4.9 miles (7.9 km) long and flows through Davidson Township. The watershed of the stream has an area of 6.42 square miles (16.6 km^{2}). Its tributaries include Quinn Run and Meeker Run. The stream also has a number of waterfalls. It is partly in Pennsylvania State Game Lands Number 13. The forests near the stream largely consist of second-growth woods.

== Course ==
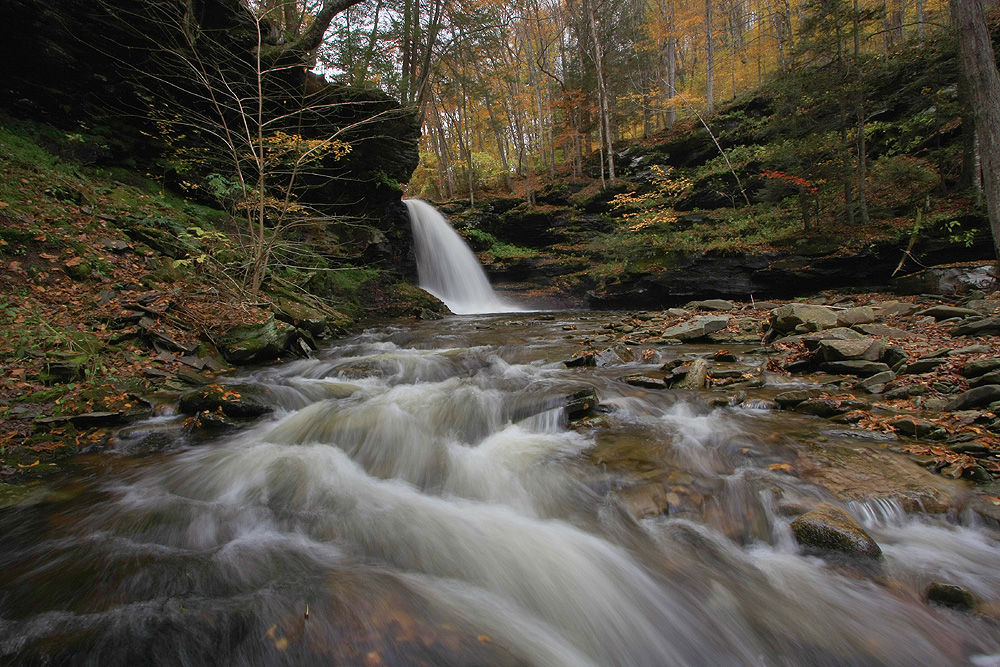
Lewis Falls, the uppermost falls before the confluence with Quinn Run. State Game Lands 13, Sullivan County.

Heberly Run begins on the top of a mountain in Davidson Township. It flows east for a few tenths of a mile, quickly becoming highly steep. It then turns roughly south and its valley becomes very deep, reaching heights of approximately 500 feet (150 m) within 2 miles (3.2 km). In this stretch, the stream receives Meeker Run, its first tributary. Eventually, Heberly Run turns southeast and then east, its valley becoming 700 feet (210 m) deep. At the Lewis Falls, it receives Quinn Run and turns southeast. After approximately a mile, the stream's valley becomes 900 feet (270 m) deep. Shortly after this, it enters the valley of East Branch Fishing Creek and reaches its confluence with that creek near the border between Sullivan County and Columbia County.

Heberly Run joins East Branch Fishing Creek 4.50 miles (7.24 km) upstream of its mouth.

=== Tributaries ===
Tributaries of Heberly Run include Quinn Run and Meeker Run.

== Hydrology ==
At its headwaters, the discharge of Heberly Run is 5,787,000 gallons per day. Downstream of the tributary Meeker Run, the stream's discharge is 12,931,000 gallons per day. At the mouth of Heberly Run, it increases to 24,076,000 gallons per day.

The concentration of aluminum at the headwaters of Heberly Run is 0.24 milligrams per liter and the daily load is 11.73 pounds (5.32 kg). The concentration is 0.18 milligrams per liter and the load is 18.98 pounds (8.61 kg) downstream of Meeker Run. At Heberly Run's mouth, the concentration is 0.15 milligrams per liter and the daily load is 29.54 pounds (13.40 kg).

The acidity concentration at the headwaters of Heberly Run is 4.40 milligrams per liter and the alkalinity concentration is 5.84 milligrams per liter. The daily loads of these substances are 212.48 pounds (96.38 kg) and 282.02 pounds (127.92 kg), respectively. Downstream of Meeker Run, the acidity concentration is 2.87 milligrams per liter and the acidity load is 309.35 pounds (140.32 kg) per day. The alkalinity concentration is 6.83 milligrams per liter and the daily load is 737.40 pounds (334.48 kg). At the mouth of Heberly Run, the acidity concentration is 2.80 milligrams per liter and the concentration of alkalinity is 6.93 milligrams per liter. The daily loads for these substances are 562.55 pounds (255.17 kg) and 1,392.99 pounds (631.85 kg).

The pH of Heberly Run at its mouth ranges from 4.15 to 6.40, with an average of 5.60. Downstream of Meeker Run, the pH ranges between 3.88 and 6.36. The average pH here is 4.97. At the stream's headwaters, the minimum pH is 3.48 and the maximum pH is 6.30. The average is 4.91.

== Geography and geology ==
The elevation near the mouth of Heberly Run is 1,187 feet (362 m) above sea level.

There are some ravines in the vicinity of Heberly Run.

Upstream of the waterfalls, there are smooth sandstone outcroppings in the streambed of Heberly Run. The stream has created a "steep and rugged" glen in the plateau that it is located on.

== Watershed ==
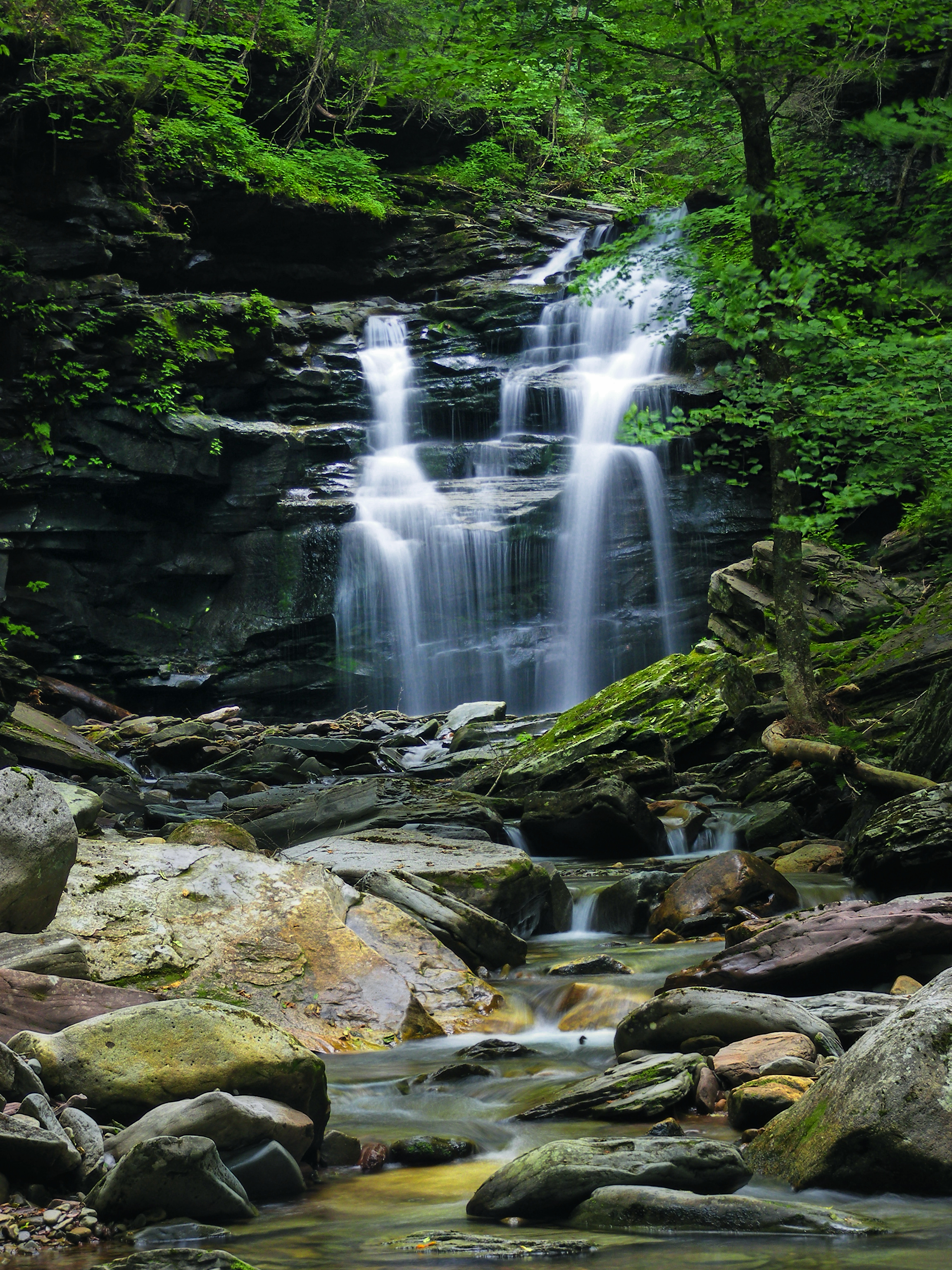
Big Falls on Heberly Run

The watershed of Heberly Run has an area of 6.42 square miles (16.6 km^{2}). It is difficult to access the stream by road.

There are a number of waterfalls on Heberly Run. These include Lewis Falls, Twin Falls, Big Falls and several others. Most of these waterfalls are fairly small. Big Falls is 34 feet (10 m) high and Lewis Falls is 22 feet (6.7 m) high. The upper Twin Falls are 13 feet (4.0 m) high and the lower Twin Falls are 9 feet (2.7 m) high. There is also an unnamed waterfall that is 8 feet (2.4 m) high. There are also waterfalls on the tributary Quinn Run.

The vicinity of Heberly Run is described as "very scenic" in the Sullivan County Natural Areas Inventory.

The community of Jamison City is fairly near the watershed of Heberly Run.

== Biology ==
There are second-growth woods in the watershed of Heberly Run. Trees found near the stream include hemlock and black birch. Other plants living there include wood sorrel and violets. A plant species that is threatened in Pennsylvania is found near the stream, as is one that is endangered in the state. The endangered species is becoming less common in the area.

The low pH of Heberly Run makes it difficult for fish to reproduce in the stream.

== Recreation ==
Heberly Run flows through the Pennsylvania State Game Lands Number 13. This area is less frequently visited than the nearby Ricketts Glen State Park.

A hiking trail known as Waterfall Wonderland follows Heberly Run for part of its length. A more difficult version of this hike is considerably closer to the stream and at times goes up the streambed itself. The trail requires bushwhacking in places.

== See also ==
- List of tributaries of Fishing Creek (North Branch Susquehanna River)
- Sullivan Branch
