= East Branch Fishing Creek =

Coordinates: 41°16′32″N 76°22′30″W

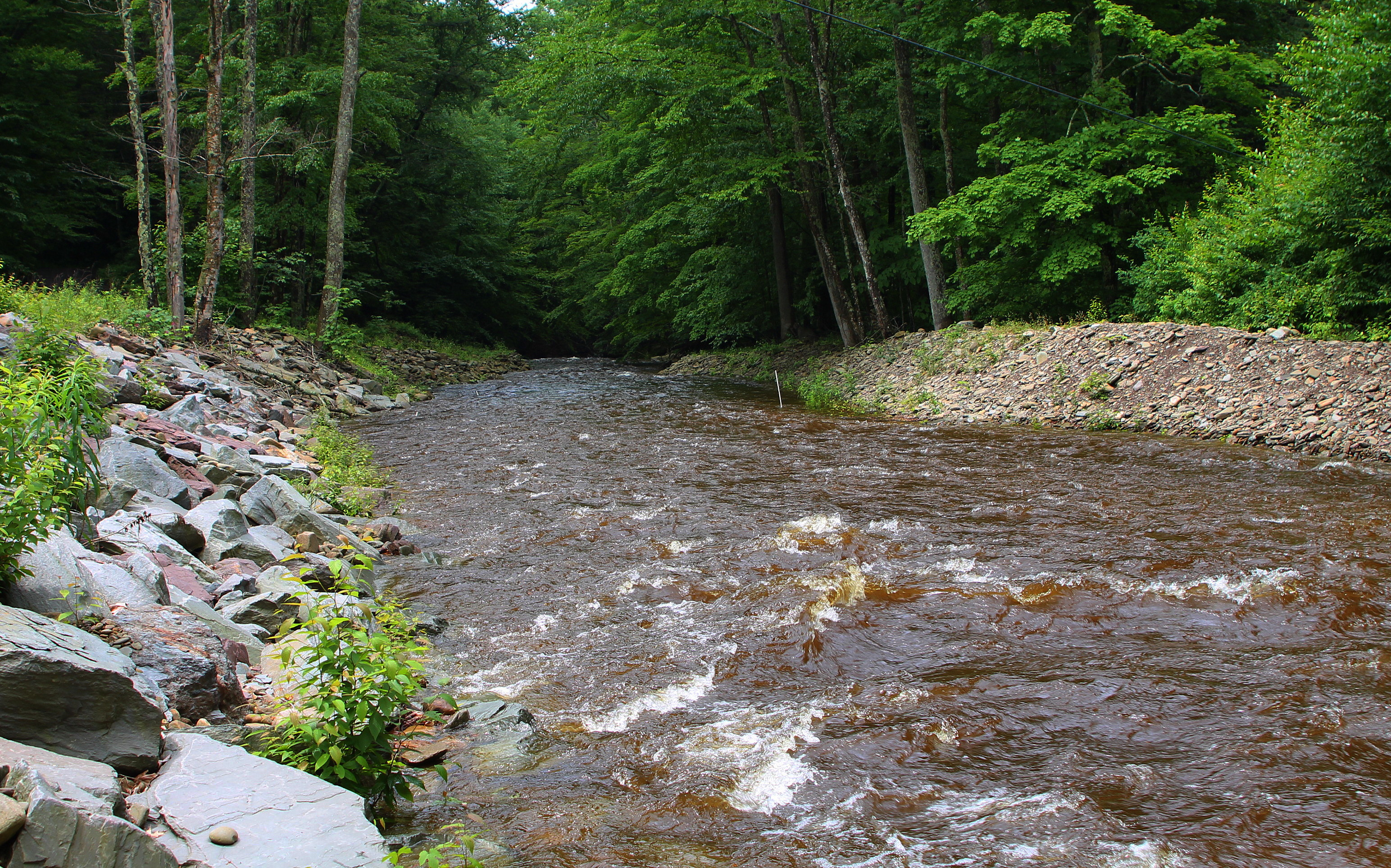
- East Branch Fishing Creek

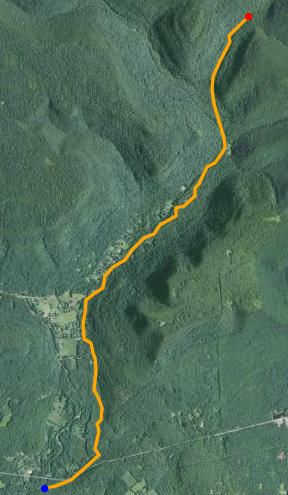
- Satellite map of East Branch Fishing Creek. The red dot is the stream's source and blue dot is its mouth.

Physical characteristics
- Source
  - location: Confluence of Sullivan Branch and Big Run
- Mouth
  - location: West Branch Fishing Creek
- Length: 4.4 mi (7.1 km)

Basin features
- Tributaries
  - left: Big Run, Lead Run, Trout Run
  - right: Sullivan Branch, Heberly Run, Blackberry Run

East Branch Fishing Creek is a tributary of Fishing Creek in Columbia County and Sullivan County, Pennsylvania, in the United States. It is 4.4 miles (7.1 km) long. The stream and its tributaries are acidic and contain aluminum. The area in the vicinity was first settled in the late 18th century.

== Course ==
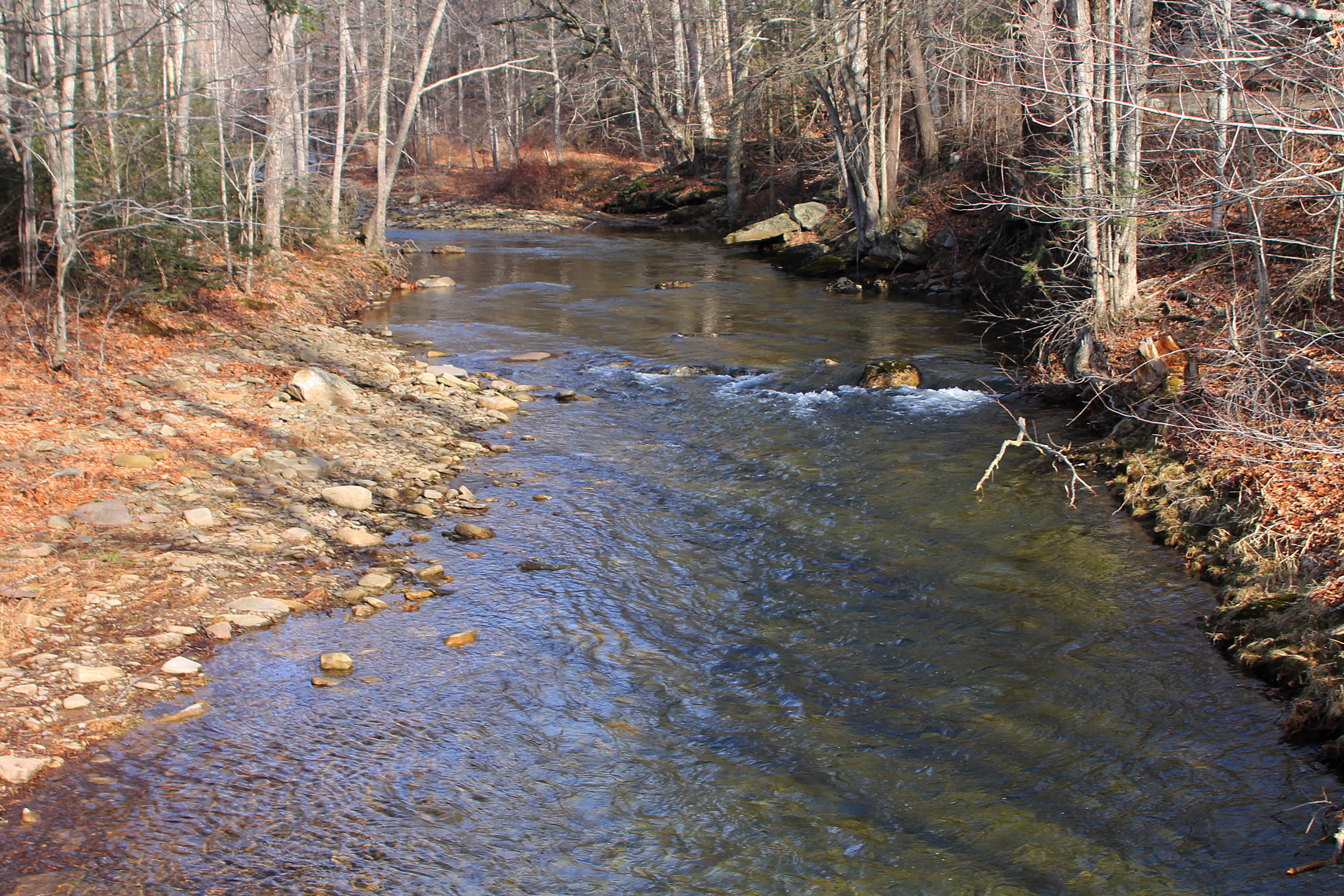
East Branch Fishing Creek looking upstream

East Branch Fishing Creek primarily flows in a largely westward direction, from its source at State Game Lands #13, slightly west of Ricketts Glen State Park, to its mouth slightly north of Grassmere Park. The creek starts at the confluence of Sullivan Branch and Big Run. It starts flowing southwards for approximately one mile before picking up Heberly Run, its longest tributary. Further on, it receives Lead Run and turns southwest towards Jamison City. Shortly after the turn, the creek receives Trout Run, one of its shortest named tributaries. In Jamison City, the creek receives Blackberry Run and several unnamed tributaries before flowing into West Branch Fishing Creek. The total elevation change between East Branch Fishing Creek's source and its mouth is 1,500 feet (460 m).

== Hydrology ==
At one location, East Branch Fishing Creek's discharge is 19.7 cubic feet per second. The average discharges of the streams in the creek's watershed range from 63 gallons per minute at the headwaters of Heberly Run to 15,498 gallons per minute at East Branch Fishing Creek's mouth.

The creek's watershed is acidic. One contributing factor to this may be the presence of acidic bogs. It is a freestone stream.

The average pHs of the streams in the East Branch Fishing Creek watershed range from 4.32 to 5.76. The lowest pH occurs on Meeker Run and the highest pH occurs on Shanty Run. At two sites on East Branch Fishing Creek itself, the creek's pH is 5.34 (at its confluence with Lead Run) and 5.63 (at its mouth). The average amount of aluminum in the streams in the watershed ranges from 0.024 milligrams per liter to 0.366 milligrams per liter. The highest concentration occurs on Ore Run and the lowest concentration occurs on the mouth of East Branch Fishing Creek. One stream in the watershed, Big Run, has a pH range of less than 3 to slightly under 7. The main stem has a pH range of slightly over 4 to slightly over 6.

During a study of the waters of East Branch Fishing Creek and its tributaries, no stream miles in the watershed have been rated as very good. 27% (9.23 stream miles) have been rated as good, 30% (10.21 stream miles) have been rated as fair, 14% (4.8 stream miles) have been rated as poor, 3% (1.07 stream miles) have been rated as very poor, and 26% (8.85 stream miles) have been rated as severe. The lowest-quality water tends to be on Meeker Run, Blackberry Run, Sullivan Branch, Ore Run, and Lead Run. Big Run, Quinn Run, and the East Branch Fishing Creek mouth have the highest-quality waters.

East Branch Fishing Creek receives an average of 39.16 tons of calcium carbonate per year.

The number of pounds of acidity that flow through various streams in the watershed of East Branch Fishing Creek per day ranges from 197.74 pounds (89.69 kg) at the headwaters of Sullivan Branch to 1,788.14 pounds (811.09 kg) downstream of the confluence of East Branch Fishing Creek with Trout Run. The number of pounds of acid per day flowing through East Branch Fishing Creek itself ranges from 1,569.07 pounds (711.72 kg) downstream of East Branch Fishing Creek's confluence with Lead Run to 1,788.14 pounds (811.09 kg) downstream of East Branch Fishing Creek's confluence with Trout Run.

The number of pounds of aluminum that flow through various streams in the watershed of East Branch Fishing Creek per day ranges from 11.73 pounds (5.32 kg) at the headwaters of Heberly Run to 316.35 pounds (143.49 kg) downstream of East Branch Fishing Creek's confluence with Lead Run. The number of pounds of aluminum per day flowing through East Branch Fishing Creek itself ranges from 83.40 pounds (37.83 kg) at the creek's mouth to 316.35 pounds (143.49 kg) on East Branch Fishing Creek downstream of its confluence with Lead Run.

The average water temperature on East Branch Fishing Creek in 2009 ranged from 9.1 to 11.3 °C (48.4 to 52.3 °F) at various sites along the creek and its tributaries.

== Geology ==
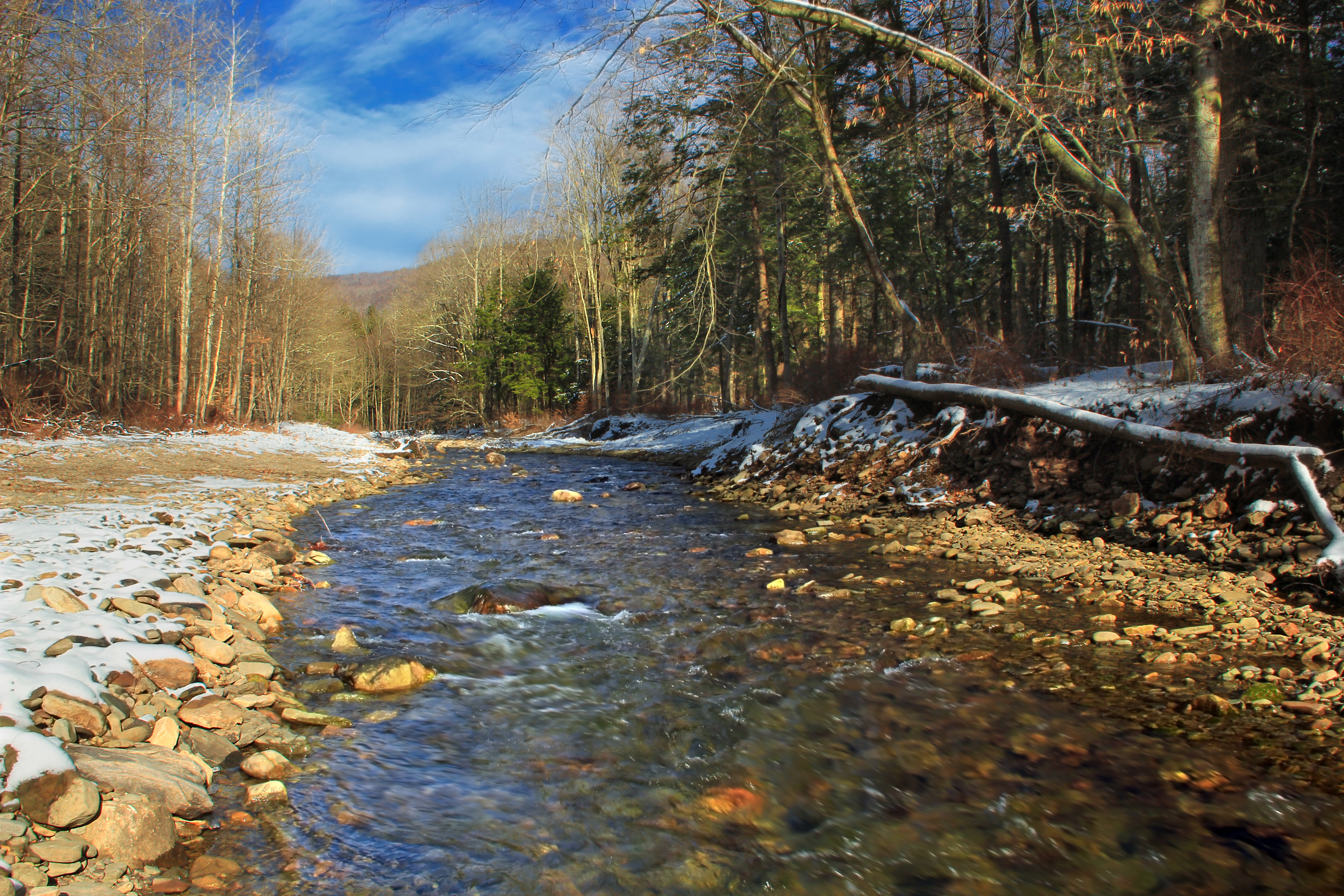
East Branch Fishing Creek in the winter

The rock underneath the East Branch Fishing Creek watershed consists of sandstone and interbedded sedimentary rock. However, there is little limestone bedrock in the watershed, unlike many watersheds in Pennsylvania. Most of the watershed is in the High Plateau Section of the Appalachian Plateau Province, but a small part of it is in the Ridge and Valley Province.

There are a number of rock formations in the East Branch Fishing Creek watershed. These are the Burgoon Sandstone, the Huntley Mountain Formation, the Catskill Formation, and the Mauch Chunk Formation. The Burgoon Sandstone primarily occurs in the northern, eastern, and western parts of the watershed. The Huntley Mountain Formation occurs in the southeastern part of the watershed, as well as on most of the main tributaries of the creek. The Catskill Formation largely occurs along the main stem. The Mauch Chunk Formation occurs in a small area in the northern part of the watershed.

There are ten main soil associations in the East Branch Fishing Creek watershed. These include the Dystrochrepts/Deep-Wellsboro-Oquaga, the Oquaga, the Lackawanna, the Lackawana-Oquaga, the Wellsboro, the Barbour, the Morris, the Norwich, the Udifluvents, and the Basher. There are also rock outcroppings and several minor soil associations. The soils in the watershed are all strongly acidic, except on East Branch Fishing Creek itself.

The Dystrochrepts/Deep-Wellsboro-Oquaga soil association occurs in close proximity to East Branch Fishing Creek and its tributaries themselves. The Oquaga soil association occurs in the Blackberry Run, Trout Run, Lead Run, Heberly Run, and Piegon Run sub-watersheds. It also occurs in the northwestern corner of the watershed. The Lackawanna soil association occurs in the southern part of the watershed, starting just below Blackberry Run's confluence with East Branch Fishing Creek. The Wellsboro soil association occurs near the headwaters of Blackberry Run, Lead Run, Big Run, and Heberly Run. The Barbour soil association occurs on East Branch Fishing Creek near its mouth. The Morris soil association occurs in scattered areas in the northern part of the watershed. The Norwich soil association occurs in some areas at the headwaters of Heberly Run, Lead Run, Piegon Run, and Blackberry Run. The Udifluvents soil association occurs near the confluence of Heberly Run and East Branch Fishing Creek. The Basher soil association occurs in the southeastern portion of the watershed.

== Watershed ==
The watershed of East Branch Fishing Creek is entirely within the boundaries of Sullivan and Columbia Counties. There are a total of 34.16 stream miles in the watershed. As of 2010, there are 100 people in the watershed. 93.03% of the watershed consists of forest, 6.86% of the watershed is grassland, 0.06% of the land is agricultural, and 0.03% is water or wetlands. None of the watershed is barren. The entire watershed has an area of 19.5 square miles.

== History ==
One of the first settlers in the vicinity of East Branch Fishing Creek was Thomas Fritz, who arrived there in 1795 from Philadelphia. In 1864, a group of Union Army troops searched for deserters and draft evaders in East Branch Fishing Creek. This event is known as the Fishing Creek Confederacy. In 1907, the community of Jamison City was supplied with fish and fish eggs from East Branch Fishing Creek. United States president Theodore Roosevelt had a 700-acre mountain resort near to the creek.

== Fauna and flora ==
23.8 of the stream miles in East Branch Fishing Creek's watershed are a high-quality cold-water fishery. However, due to the low pH of the tributary Heberly Run, there are not many fish there.

== See also ==
- West Branch Fishing Creek
- List of tributaries of Fishing Creek (North Branch Susquehanna River)
