= Pocono Formation =

Geological formation in the eastern U.S.

- Stratigraphic range: Early Mississippian
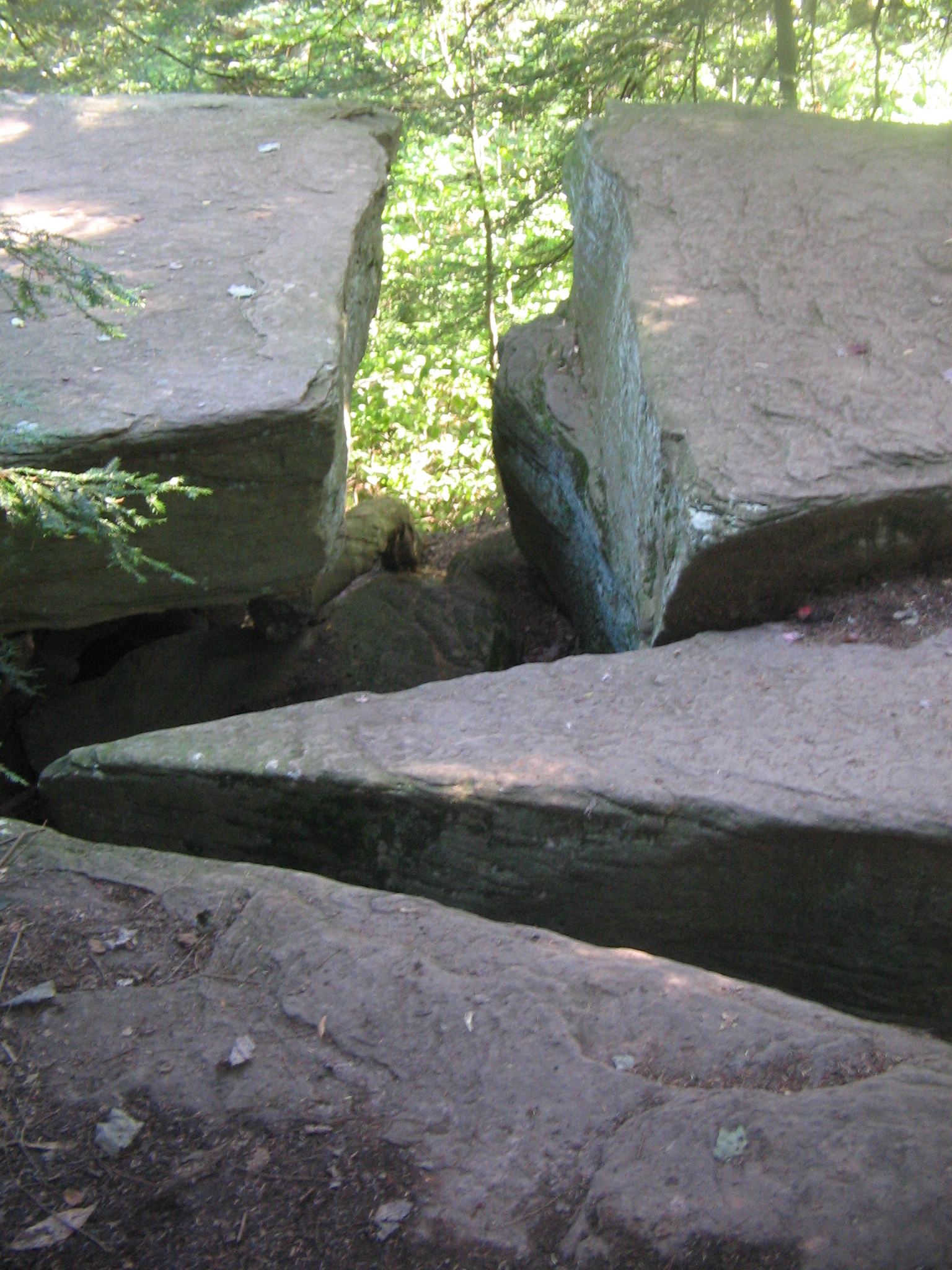
- Outcrop at Ricketts Glen State Park
- Type: sedimentary
- Underlies: Mauch Chunk Formation
- Overlies: Catskill Formation, Huntley Mountain Formation, Rockwell Formation, and Spechty Kopf Formation

Lithology
- Primary: Quartzarenite (sandstone)
- Other: Conglomerate

Location
- Region: Appalachian Mountains
- Extent: Pennsylvania and Virginia

Type section
- Named by: Lesley, 1876

The Mississippian Pocono Formation is a mapped bedrock unit in Pennsylvania, Maryland, and West Virginia, in the United States. It is also known as the Pocono Group in Maryland and West Virginia, and the upper part of the Pocono Formation is sometimes called the Burgoon Formation or Burgoon Sandstone in Pennsylvania. The Pocono is a major ridge-former In the Ridge-and-Valley Appalachians of the eastern United States

The Pocono is also a lateral equivalent of the Purslane Sandstone in Maryland and West Virginia. D. Brezinski of Maryland Geological Survey recommended abandoning use of the term Pocono in Maryland in favor of "Purslane" in 1989.

== Description ==
The Pocono is a dominantly gray color with quartzitic medium to coarse-grained sandstones. The base of the Pocono Formation is marked by conglomerate.

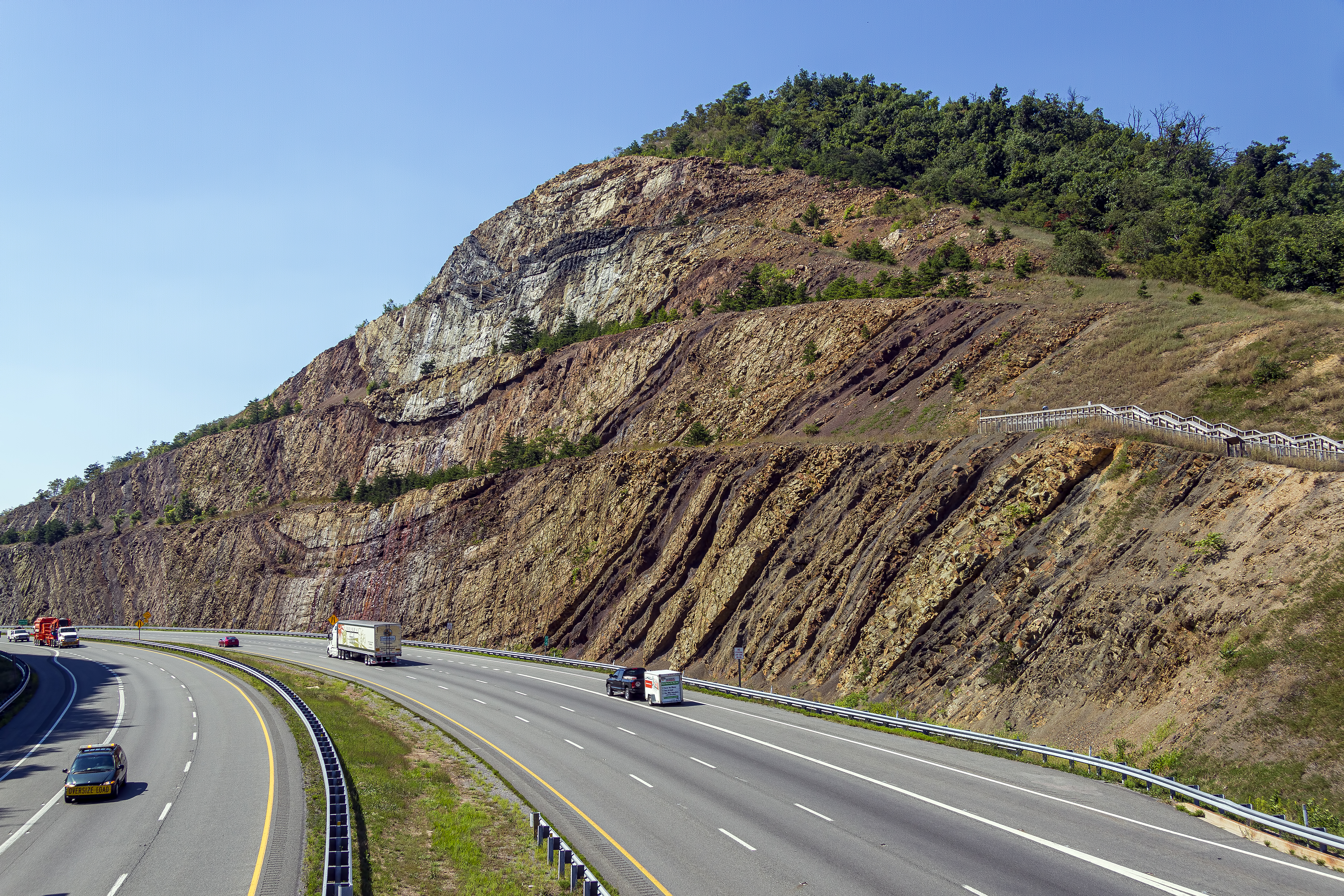
Sideling Hill roadcut

=== Notable exposures ===
- The type section of the Burgoon Sandstone is in the valley of Burgoon Run, above Kittanning Point, Blair County, Pennsylvania.
- A spectacular exposure of the Purslane Sandstone (equivalent to the Pocono) is at the I-68 road cut through Sideling Hill in Maryland.

== Age ==
Relative age dating of the Pocono places it in the lower Mississippian period. The lower boundary is with the Spetchy Kopf Formation and Huntley Mountain Formation. In South-central Pennsylvania, the Pocono often interfingers with the Rockwell Formation.

== See also ==
- Geology of Pennsylvania
- Canaan Valley
