= Huntley Mountain Formation =

Bedrock unit in Pennsylvania, United States

- Stratigraphic range: Late Devonian to Early Mississippian
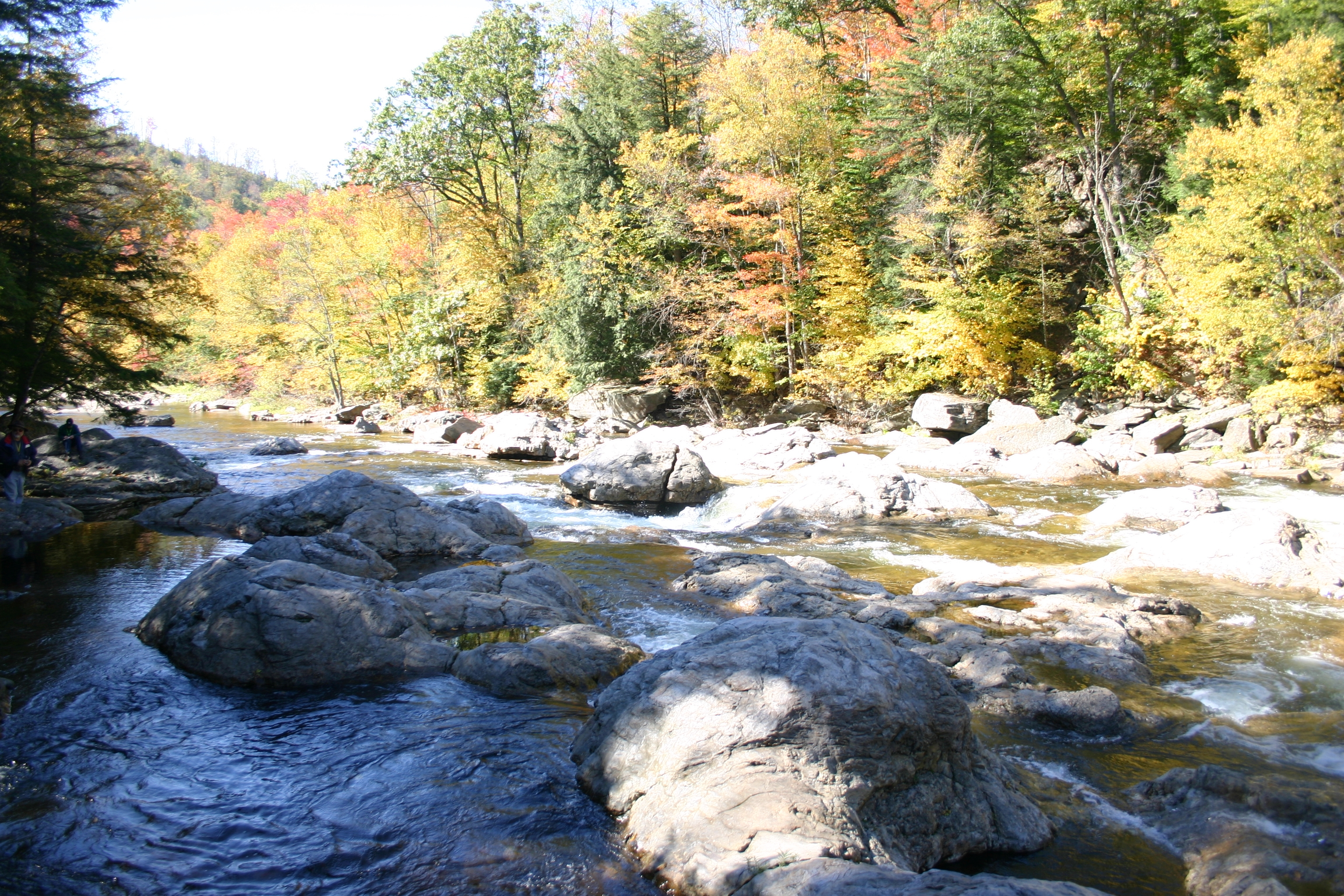
- The Haystacks of Loyalsock Creek in Laporte Township, Sullivan County, Pennsylvania are a quartzite bed of the Huntley Mountain Formation
- Type: sedimentary
- Underlies: Burgoon Sandstone

Lithology
- Primary: sandstone, shale

Location
- Region: Appalachian Mountains
- Extent: Pennsylvania

Type section
- Named for: Huntley Mountain, Lycoming County, Pennsylvania
- Named by: Berg and Edmunds, 1978

The Huntley Mountain Formation is a late Devonian and early Mississippian mapped bedrock unit in Pennsylvania, in the United States.

== Description ==
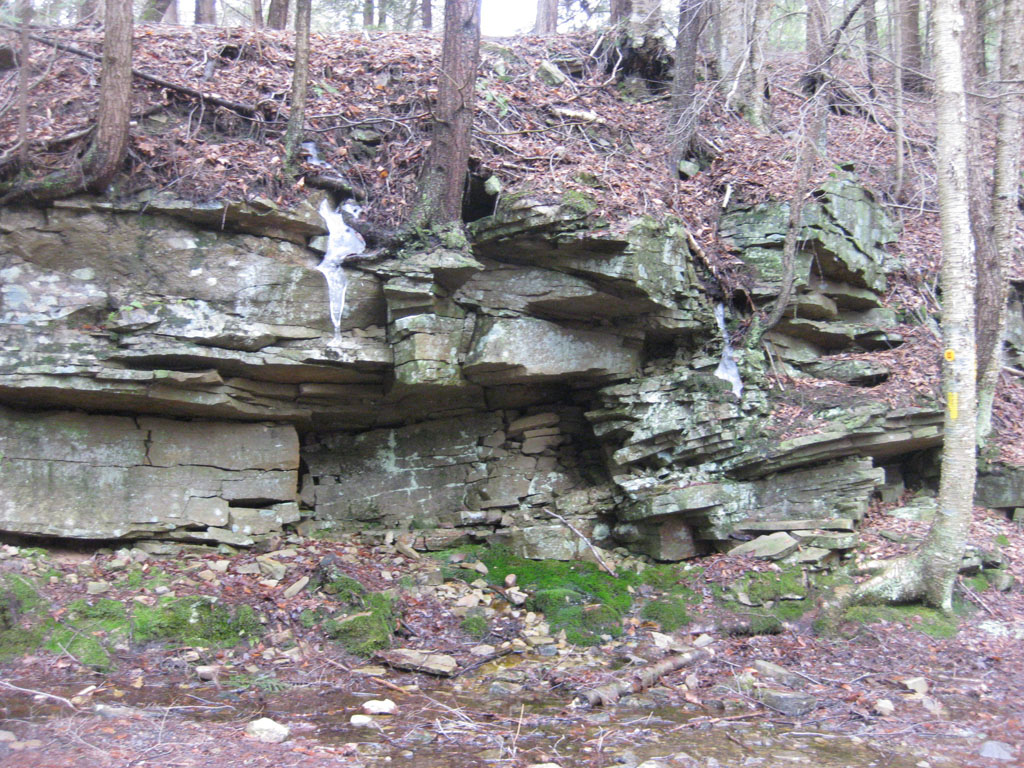
Outcrop of Huntley Mountain Formation along old railroad bed parallel to Loyalsock Creek north of Laporte, Pennsylvania

The formation is composed of relatively soft grayish-red shale and olive-gray sandstone. It is located in north central Pennsylvania.

=== Haystacks ===
The Haystacks are enigmatic mounds of sandstone that outcrop in Loyalsock Creek south of Dushore in Sullivan County. They are a single bed of quartz sandstone with an undulating upper surface with up to one meter relief. The origin of the mounds is debatable.

=== Notable Exposures ===
- The type section of the formation is at Huntley Mountain in Lycoming County, Pennsylvania, on the mountainside just north of the village of Waterville.
- Base of the Loyalsock Creek gorge in Worlds End State Park
- Haystacks beds, also in Loyalsock Creek

== Stratigraphy ==
Geologist William E. Edmunds argues that the Huntley Mountain Formation is laterally equivalent to the Rockwell Formation (originally described in West Virginia) and the Spechty Kopf Formation. He proposes that the Pocono Formation be reinstated as "the dominantly non-red, non-marine clastic sequence between the Catskill and Mauch Chunk Formations", with the Huntley Mountain, Beckville, Burgoon, Rockwell, Mt. Carbon, and Spechty Kopf Formations demoted to the status of members of the Pocono Formation. Other workers support this interpretation.

== See also ==
- Geology of Pennsylvania
