= Bearwallow Run =

- Location of Bearwallow Run mouth Bearwallow Run (the United States)

Physical characteristics
- Source
  - location: valley on Huckleberry Mountain in Davidson Township, Sullivan County, Pennsylvania
  - elevation: between 2,300 and 2,320 feet (700 and 710 m)
- Mouth
  - location: Shingle Mill Run in Davidson Township, Sullivan County, Pennsylvania
  - coordinates: 41°18′14″N 76°29′39″W
  - elevation: 1,765 ft (538 m)
- Length: 1.3 mi (2.1 km)
- Basin size: 1.02 sq mi (2.6 km^{2})

Basin features
- Progression: Shingle Mill Run → West Branch Fishing Creek → Fishing Creek → Susquehanna River → Chesapeake Bay
- Tributaries
  - right: one unnamed tributary

Bearwallow Run is a tributary of Shingle Mill Run in Sullivan County, Pennsylvania, in the United States. It is approximately 1.3 miles (2.1 km) long and flows through Davidson Township, Sullivan County, Pennsylvania. The watershed of the stream has an area of 1.02 square miles (2.6 km^{2}). The stream is considered to be Class B Wild Trout Waters and wild trout reproduce naturally within it. The surficial geology in the area mainly consists of bedrock and Boulder Colluvium.

== Course ==
Bearwallow Run begins in a valley on Huckleberry Mountain in Davidson Township. It flows northeast for several hundred feet before turning east for a short distance. It then turns east-northeast for several tenths of a mile before receiving an unnamed tributary from the right. It then turns northeast. Several tenths of a mile further downstream, the stream reaches its confluence with Shingle Mill Run.

Bearwallow Run joins Shingle Mill Run 0.84 miles (1.35 km) upstream of its mouth.

== Geography and geology ==
The elevation near the mouth of Bearwallow Run is 1,765 feet (538 m) above sea level. The elevation of the stream's source is between 2,300 and 2,320 feet (700 and 710 m) above sea level.

The surficial geology in the vicinity of Bearwallow Run mostly consists of bedrock containing sandstone and shale, especially on the valley slopes and plateaus. However, some Boulder Colluvium is also present along the stream. Boulder Colluvium contains numerous boulders made of quartz, sandstone, or conglomerate. The surficial geology in the upper reaches of the stream is much the same, with Boulder Colluvium on the valley floors and bedrock elsewhere.

== Watershed ==
The watershed of Bearwallow Run has an area of 1.02 square miles (2.6 km^{2}). Its mouth of in the United States Geological Survey quadrangle of Elk Grove. However, its source is in the quadrangle of Sonestown.

The watershed of Bearwallow Run is in the vicinity of the North Mountain region. The stream is in the southwestern part of Pennsylvania State Game Lands Number 13.

== History ==
Bearwallow Run was entered into the Geographic Names Information System on August 2, 1979. Its identifier in the Geographic Names Information System is 1192106.

There were plans to make the area in the vicinity of Bearwallow Run part of Pennsylvania State Game Lands Number 13 as early as 1930.

== Biology ==
Wild trout naturally reproduce in Bearwallow Run from its headwaters downstream to its mouth. The entire length of the stream is considered by the Pennsylvania Fish and Boat Commission to be Class B Wild Trout Waters.

== See also ==
- List of tributaries of Fishing Creek (North Branch Susquehanna River)
- List of rivers of Pennsylvania
