= Painter Run =

Painter Run Painter's Run
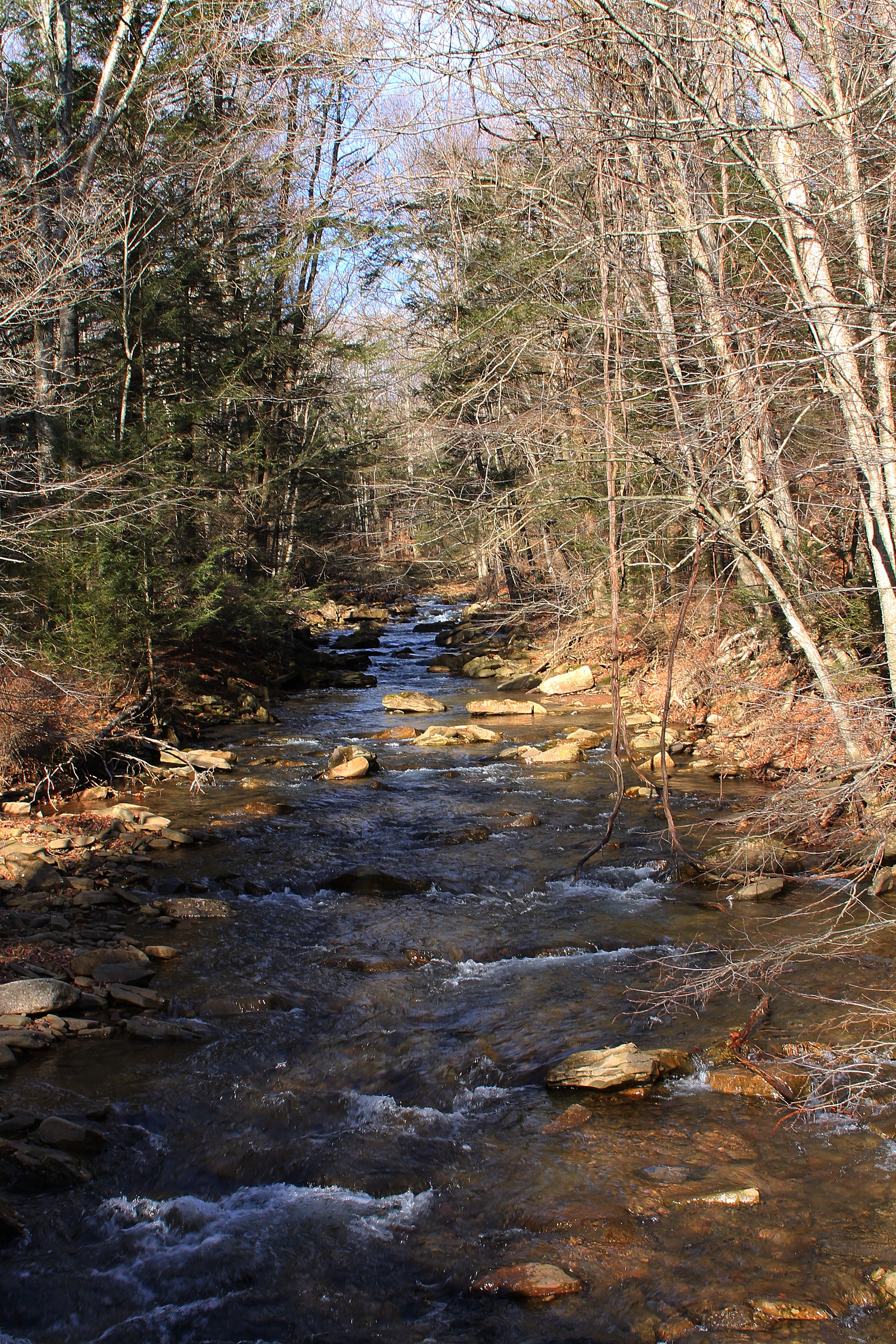
- Painter Run looking upstream near its mouth

Physical characteristics
- Source
  - location: small pond in a shallow valley in Davidson Township, Sullivan County, Pennsylvania
  - elevation: between 2,200 and 2,220 feet (670 and 680 m)
- Mouth
  - location: West Branch Fishing Creek in Davidson Township, Sullivan County, Pennsylvania
  - coordinates: 41°18′16″N 76°26′07″W
  - elevation: 1,296 ft (395 m)
- Length: 4.5 mi (7.2 km)
- Basin size: 5.20 mi^{2} (13.5 km^{2})

Basin features
- Progression: West Branch Fishing Creek → Fishing Creek → Susquehanna River → Chesapeake Bay
- Tributaries
  - left: one unnamed tributary
  - right: one unnamed tributary, Oxhorn Run

Painter Run (also known as Painter's Run) is a tributary of West Branch Fishing Creek in Sullivan County, Pennsylvania, in the United States. It is approximately 4.5 miles (7.2 km) long and flows through Davidson Township. The watershed of the stream has an area of 5.20 square miles (13.5 km^{2}). It has one named tributary, which is known as Oxhorn Run and one unnamed tributary. Painter Run is slightly acidic, with pH values ranging from 5.99 to 6.88. The stream is in a narrow valley with several ridges nearby. Sandstone of the Pocono Formation occurs near it. At least two bridges have been constructed over the stream. Its unnamed tributary is considered to be Class A Wild Trout Waters.

== Course ==
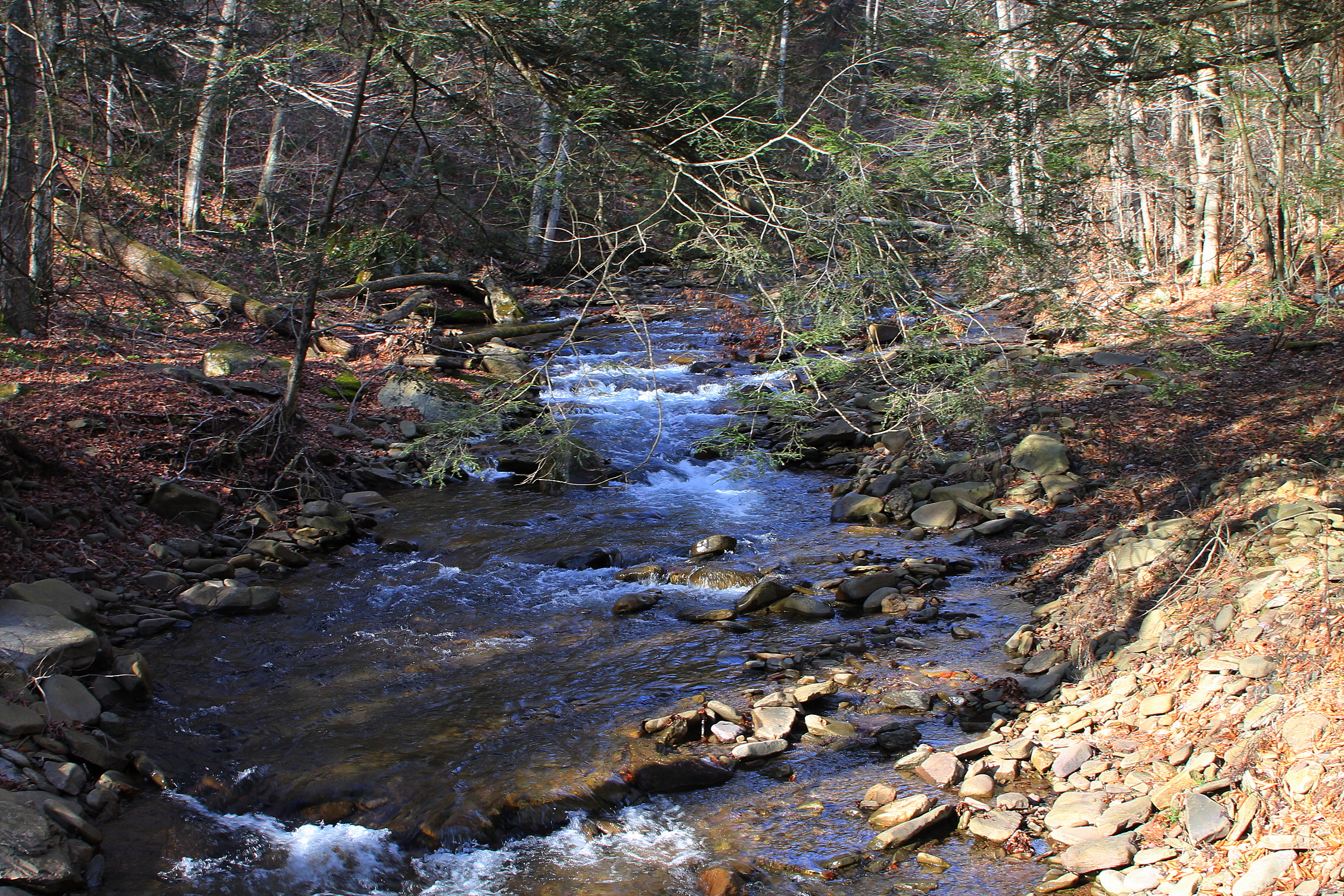
Painter Run above Oxhorn Run

Painter Run begins in a small pond in a shallow valley in Davidson Township. It flows southeast for a few tenths of a mile and receives an unnamed tributary from the right. It then turns east for several tenths of a mile and its valley becomes deeper and narrower. The stream gradually turns south and receives an unnamed tributary from the left. After several tenths of a miles, it receives another unnamed tributary from the right. The stream then turns southeast for some distance and its valley continues to become deeper. It then receives another unnamed tributary from the left and turns southeast for approximately a mile, flowing alongside State Route 2003. It then gradually turns south-southeast and receives its only named tributary, Oxhorn Run, from the right. Several tenths of a mile further downstream, it reaches its confluence with West Branch Fishing Creek.

Painter Run joins West Branch Fishing Creek 6.12 miles (9.85 km) upstream of its mouth.

=== Tributaries ===
Painter Run has one named tributary, which is known as Oxhorn Run. It also has one unnamed tributary. Oxhorn Run joins Painter Run 0.58 miles (0.93 km) upstream of its mouth. The watershed of Oxhorn Run has an area of 0.87 square miles (2.3 km^{2}). The unnamed tributary joins Painter Run 2.2 miles (3.5 km) upstream of its mouth.

== Hydrology ==
Between June 2010 and April 2011, the water temperature of Painter Run was measured four times. On June 18, the temperature was 59.6 °F (15.3 °C) and on November 13, it was 40.7 °F (4.8 °C). On April 9, 2011, the temperature was 39.6 °F (4.2 °C) and on January 4, 2011, it was 32.6 °F (0.3 °C). The specific conductance of the stream's waters was 37, 21, 15, and 20 micro-siemens per centimeter, respectively.

Between June 2010 and April 2011, the pH of Painter Run was measured four times. The lowest pH was 5.99 on January 4, 2011 and the highest pH was 6.88 on June 18, 2010. The pH of the stream was 6.598 on November 13, 2010 and 6.20 on April 9, 2011.

Painter Run is designated by the Pennsylvania Department of Environmental Protection for use for aquatic life. It attains the Pennsylvania Department of Environmental Protection's standards. However, its tributary Oxhorn Run does not meet the standards and is considered by the Pennsylvania Department of Environmental Protection to be impaired.

== Geography and geology ==
The elevation near the mouth of Painter Run is 1,296 feet (395 m) above sea level. The elevation of the stream's source is between 2,200 and 2,220 feet (670 and 680 m) above sea level.

Painter Run is in a narrow valley between two mountains. There is also a ridge to the north of the stream. Another ridge lies between the stream and West Branch Fishing Creek.

Sandstone of the Pocono Formation occurs near the headwaters of Painter Run. In most of the stream's valley, alluvium, alluvial terrace, alluvial fan, and a glacial till known as the Wisconsinan Till can be found. The Wisconsinan Bouldery Till occurs on the eastern side of the stream's valley in its lower reaches. Bedrock consisting of sandstone and shale can also be found in the vicinity of the stream.

During the Wisconsinan Glaciation, tongues of ice flowed northwest up Painter Run.

== Watershed ==
The watershed of Painter Run has an area of 5.20 square miles (13.5 km^{2}). The stream is entirely within the United States Geological Survey quadrangle of Elk Grove.

An unnamed tributary of Painter Run is considered by the Pennsylvania Fish and Boat Commission to be Class A Wild Trout Waters from its source to its mouth. The headwaters of Painter Run are in a pond.

== History ==
Painter Run was entered into the Geographic Names Information System on August 2, 1979. Its identifier in the Geographic Names Information System is 1183207.

In 1864, it was alleged that an organization known as the Fishing Creek Confederacy constructed a fort in the upper reaches of the Fishing Creek watershed. The supposed remains of the fort are in the vicinity of Painter Run. Approximately a thousand soldiers searched the watersheds of East Branch Fishing Creek and West Branch Fishing Creek for deserters and any sign of a fort. However, they were unable to find any evidence of a fort and returned to Bloomsburg, Pennsylvania.

A steel stringer/multi-beam or girder bridge was constructed over Painter Run in 1930. It is 26.9 feet (8.2 m) long and carries State Route 2003. Another bridge of the same type was built over the stream 1.5 miles (2.4 km) west of Elk Grove in 1957. This bridge is 44.0 feet (13.4 m) long and carries State Route 2003. The latter bridge was listed as structurally deficient by 2012. In June 2012, there were plans to repair it in early July 2012.

== See also ==
- Bloody Run (West Branch Fishing Creek), next tributary of West Branch Fishing Creek going downstream
- Big Run (West Branch Fishing Creek), next tributary of West Branch Fishing Creek going upstream
- List of tributaries of Fishing Creek (North Branch Susquehanna River)
