= Shingle Mill Run =

River in Pennsylvania, USA

- Location of Shingle Mill Run mouth Shingle Mill Run (the United States)

Physical characteristics
- Source
  - location: valley in Davidson Township, Sullivan County, Pennsylvania
  - elevation: between 2,300 and 2,320 feet (700 and 710 m)
- Mouth
  - location: West Branch Fishing Creek in Davidson Township, Sullivan County, Pennsylvania
  - coordinates: 41°18′18″N 76°28′43″W
  - elevation: 1,572 ft (479 m)
- Length: 2.4 mi (3.9 km)
- Basin size: 2.60 sq mi (6.7 km^{2})

Basin features
- Progression: West Branch Fishing Creek → Fishing Creek → Susquehanna River → Chesapeake Bay
- Tributaries
  - right: Bearwallow Run

Shingle Mill Run is a tributary of West Branch Fishing Creek in Sullivan County, Pennsylvania, in the United States. It is approximately 2.4 miles (3.9 km) long and flows through Davidson Township. The watershed of the stream has an area of 2.60 square miles (6.7 km^{2}). The stream has one named tributary, Bearwallow Run. Shingle Mill Run is designated as an Exceptional Value stream and has a population of native trout. The stream has high water quality and is slightly acidic. Boulder Colluvium and bedrock consisting of sandstone and shale can be found near the stream.

== Course ==
Shingle Mill Run begins in a valley in Davidson Township. It flows east for approximately a mile and its valley becomes progressively deeper. The stream then turns east-southeast for several tenths of a mile. It then receives its first and only named tributary, Bearwallow Run. At this point, the stream turns east for nearly a mile before exiting its valley and reaching its confluence with West Branch Fishing Creek.

Shingle Mill Run joins West Branch Fishing Creek 7.84 miles (12.62 km) upstream of its mouth.

=== Tributaries ===
Shingle Mill Run has one named tributary, which is known as Bearwallow Run. Bearwallow Run joins Shingle Mill Run 0.84 miles (1.35 km) upstream of its mouth. Its watershed has an area of 1.02 square miles (2.6 km^{2}).

== Hydrology ==
A 1980 report stated that Shingle Mill Run had high water quality.

The water temperature of Shingle Mill Run was measured four times in the Fishing Creek Watershed Study between June 2010 and April 2011. The highest water temperature, 58.5 °F (14.7 °C), occurred on June 18, 2010 and the second-highest water temperature, 41.4 °F (5.2 °C), occurred on November 13, 2010. The second-lowest temperature was 40.0 °F (4.4 °C) and it occurred on April 9, 2011. The lowest water temperature, 32.6 °F (0.3 °C), occurred on January 4, 2011.

The specific conductivity of Shingle Mill Run was measured four times in the Fishing Creek Watershed Study between June 2010 and April 2011. The highest specific conductivity, 16 micro-siemens per centimeter, occurred on June 18, 2010. The second-highest specific conductivity, 12 micro-siemens per centimeter, occurred on November 13, 2010. Values of 11 micro-siemens per centimeter were recorded on January 4, 2011 and April 9, 2011.

In the Fishing Creek Watershed Study, the pH of Shingle Mill Run was measured four times between June 2010 and April 2011. The highest value, 6.07, occurred on June 18, 2010 and November 13, 2010. The second-lowest value, 5.50, occurred on January 4, 2011 and the lowest value, 5.17, occurred on April 9, 2011.

== Geography and geology ==
The elevation near the mouth of Shingle Mill Run is 1,572 feet (479 m) above sea level. The elevation of the stream's source is between 2,300 and 2,320 feet (700 and 710 m).

Shingle Mill Run has a high gradient and is designated as a High-Gradient Clearwater Creek. The stream is in the vicinity of North Mountain.

Shingle Mill Run is on Boulder Colluvium in its lower reaches. The surface in these areas consists largely of boulders made of quartz, sandstone, or conglomerate. Further upstream, in the stream's middle reaches, bedrock consisting of shale and sandstone is present. The headwaters of the stream are also on Boulder Colluvium.

== Watershed ==
The watershed of Shingle Mill Run has an area of 2.60 square miles (6.7 km^{2}). The stream's mouth is in the United States Geological Survey quadrangle of Elk Grove. However, its source is in the quadrangle of Sonestown. The stream is in the southern part of Davidson Township and is also in Pennsylvania State Game Lands Number 13. It is 4 miles (6.4 km) to the west of the village of Elk Grove.

Shingle Mill Run is the only named tributary of West Branch Fishing Creek to enter it from the right.

Shingle Mill Run is difficult to access.

== History ==
Shingle Mill Run was entered into the Geographic Names Information System on August 2, 1979. Its identifier in the Geographic Names Information System is 1193346.

The 2001 Sullivan County Natural Areas Inventory recommended additional surveys of Shingle Mill Run. The water temperature, pH, and specific conductivity of the stream were measured during the Fishing Creek Watershed Study managed by Matthew Opdyke in 2010 and 2011.

== Biology ==
The entire drainage basin of Shingle Mill Run is designated as an Exceptional Value stream. This designation is the highest level of protection regulated by the water quality standards of Chapter 93. The basin is also designated as a Migratory Fishery. The stream is designated by the Pennsylvania Department of Environmental Protection for use for aquatic life. It attains the standards for this use. The stream is inhabited by native trout.

A conifer swamp is located at the headwaters of Shingle Mill Run. The swamp has the potential to serve as a habitat for rare species.

== See also ==
- Big Run (West Branch Fishing Creek), next tributary of West Branch Fishing Creek going downstream
- Deep Hollow (West Branch Fishing Creek), next tributary of West Branch Fishing Creek going upstream
- List of tributaries of Fishing Creek (North Branch Susquehanna River)
