= Hemlock Run =

Physical characteristics
- Source
  - location: Roundtop in Davidson Township, Sullivan County, Pennsylvania
  - elevation: between 2,340 and 2,360 feet (710 and 720 m)
- Mouth
  - location: West Branch Fishing Creek in Davidson Township, Sullivan County, Pennsylvania
  - coordinates: 41°19′05″N 76°30′24″W
  - elevation: 1,827 ft (557 m)
- Length: 1.8 mi (2.9 km)
- Basin size: 1.28 mi^{2} (3.3 km^{2})

Basin features
- Progression: West Branch Fishing Creek → Fishing Creek → Susquehanna River → Chesapeake Bay
- Tributaries
  - left: one unnamed tributary
  - right: two unnamed tributaries

Hemlock Run is a tributary of West Branch Fishing Creek in Sullivan County, Pennsylvania, in the United States. It is approximately 1.8 miles (2.9 km) long and flows through Davidson Township. The stream has three unnamed tributaries. Its watershed has an area of 1.28 square miles (3.3 km^{2}). Wisconsinan Till Moraine, Wisconsinan Bouldery Till, Wisconsinan Flow-Till, and Wisconsinan Till all occur near the stream.

== Course ==
Hemlock Run begins on a mountain known as Roundtop in Davidson Township. It flows south-southwest for several tenths of a mile, receiving an unnamed tributary from the right. It then turns southeast for a few tenths of a mile and receives an unnamed tributary from the left before turning south-southwest and then south-southeast. The stream enters a deep valley and receives another unnamed tributary from the right. Over the next several tenths of a mile, it gradually turns south and reaches its confluence with West Branch Fishing Creek.

Hemlock Run joins West Branch Fishing Creek 9.73 miles (15.66 km) upstream of its mouth.

=== Tributaries ===
Hemlock Run has no named tributaries. However, it does have three unnamed tributaries. The first tributary is approximately 0.2 miles (0.32 km) long and joins Hemlock Run near its headwaters. The second tributary is approximately 0.6 miles (0.97 km) or 0.7 miles (1.1 km) long and the third tributary is approximately 0.4 miles (0.64 km) long.

== Geography and geology ==
The elevation near the mouth of Hemlock Run is 1,827 feet (557 m) above sea level. The elevation of the stream's source is between 2,340 and 2,360 feet (710 and 720 m) above sea level.

Hemlock Run has a bedrock gorge. Additionally, the stream has waterfalls along its length. There are several distinct arcuate ridges of till in the valley of the stream.

The terminus of the glaciers during the late Wisconsinan period of glaciation was in the vicinity of Hemlock Run. There are two buried valleys near the stream, one on either side of its gorge and waterfall reach. One of the valleys follows Hemlock Run in a northerly direction.

A small portion of the valley of Hemlock Run is on bedrock consisting of sandstone and shale. The Wisconsinan Till Moraine occurs near the stream in its lower reaches, as does the Wisconsinan Bouldery Till. Both of these are glacial or resedimented glacial tills. The latter has boulders consisting of quartz, sandstone, and conglomerate on the surface. A resedimented glacial till known as the Wisconsinan Flow-Till also occurs near the stream in its lower reaches. The Wisconsinan Till occurs in the upper reaches of the watershed.

== Watershed ==
The watershed of Hemlock Run has an area of 1.28 square miles (3.3 km^{2}). The stream is entirely within the United States Geological Survey quadrangle of Sonestown. It is in the eastern part of that quadrangle. The stream is situated on the northern side of North Mountain.

There are wingwalls made of concrete in the vicinity of Hemlock Run. Upstream of these wingwalls, there are approximately 75 feet (23 m) of R-5 riprap along the stream's west bank. This riprap is in a layer that is 24 inches (61 cm) thick. The Pennsylvania Game Commission has a permit to maintain the riprap and the streambed with the wingwalls.

== History ==
Hemlock Run was entered into the Geographic Names Information System on August 2, 1979. Its identifier in the Geographic Names Information System is 1176814.

== See also ==
- Laurel Run (West Branch Fishing Creek), next tributary of West Branch Fishing Creek going downstream
- Slip Run (West Branch Fishing Creek), next tributary of West Branch Fishing Creek going upstream
- List of tributaries of Fishing Creek (North Branch Susquehanna River)
- List of rivers of Pennsylvania
