= Oxhorn Run =

River in Sullivan County, Pennsylvania

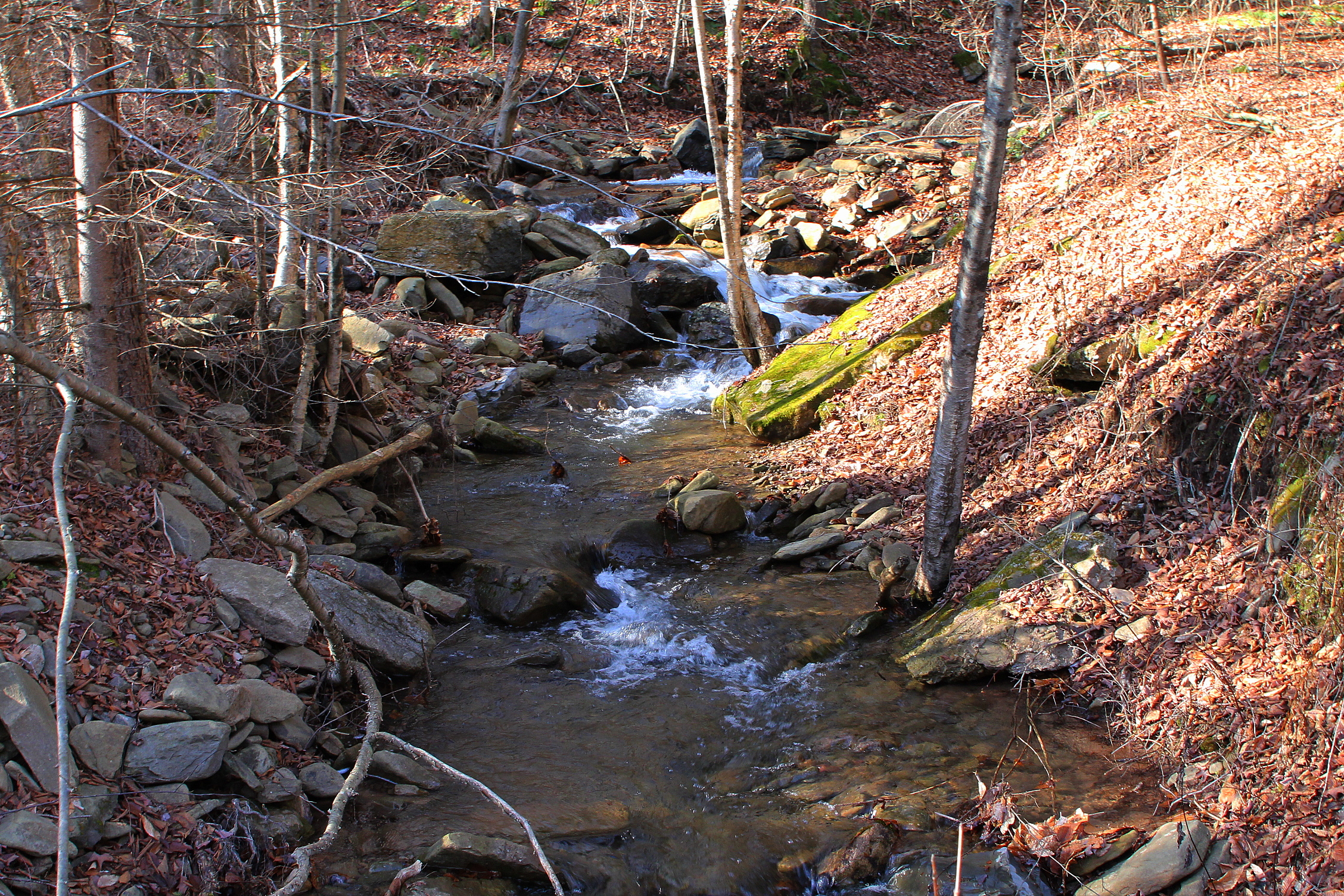
- Oxhorn Run looking upstream near its mouth

Physical characteristics
- Source
  - location: edge of a plateau in Davidson Township, Sullivan County, Pennsylvania
  - elevation: between 2,340 and 2,360 feet (710 and 720 m)
- Mouth
  - location: Painter Run in Davidson Township, Sullivan County, Pennsylvania
  - coordinates: 41°18′40″N 76°26′27″W
  - elevation: 1,430 ft (440 m)
- Length: 1.8 mi (2.9 km)
- Basin size: 0.87 mi^{2} (2.3 km^{2})

Oxhorn Run is a tributary of Painter Run in Sullivan County, Pennsylvania, in the United States. It is approximately 1.8 miles (2.9 km) long and flows through Davidson Township. The watershed of the stream has an area of 0.87 square miles (2.3 km^{2}). The stream is considered to be impaired by atmospheric deposition and pH. Wisconsinan Ice-Contact Stratified Drift, Wisconsinan Till, and bedrock consisting of sandstone and shale occur in its vicinity.

== Course ==
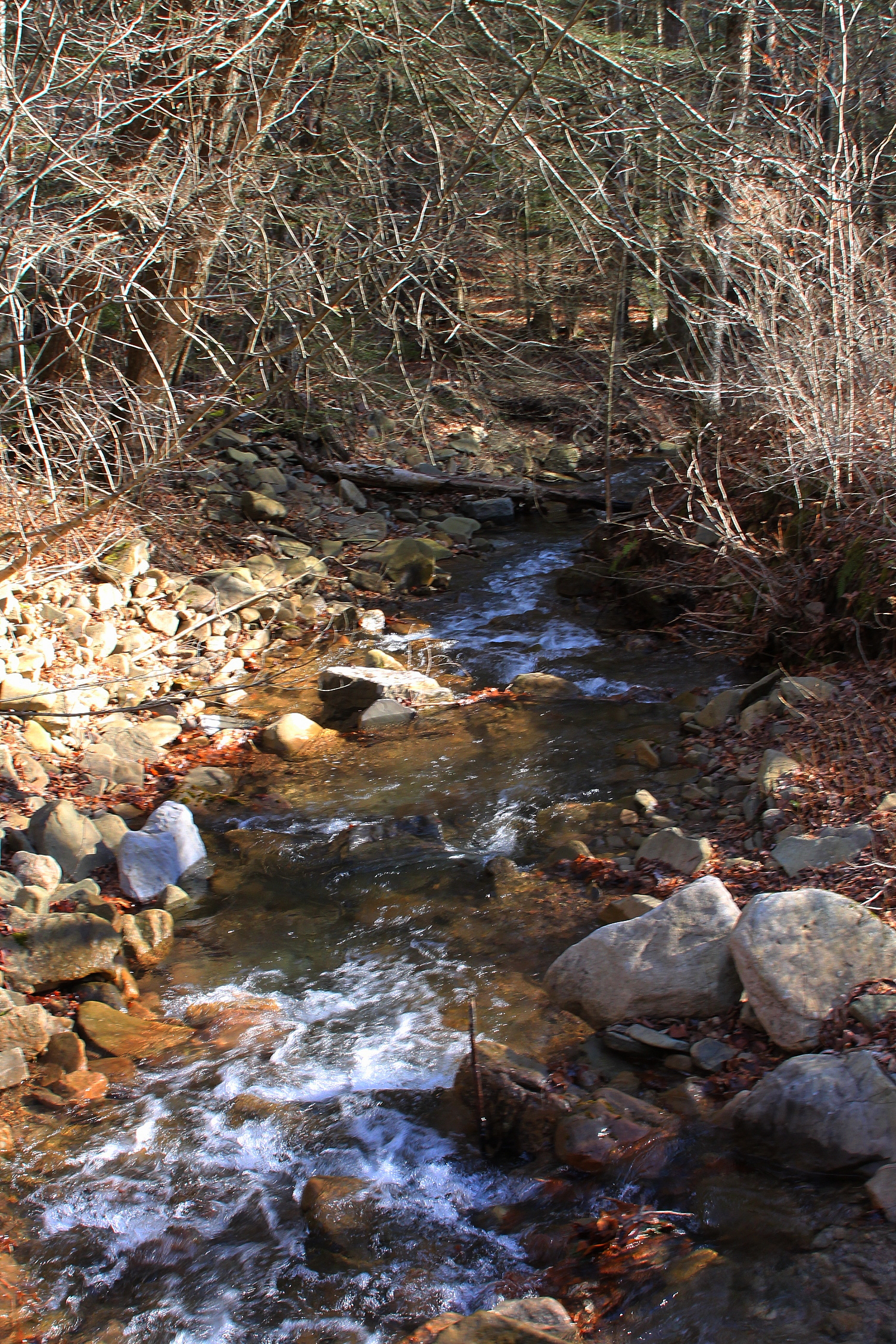
Oxhorn Run looking downstream near its mouth

Oxhorn Run begins on the edge of a plateau in Davidson Township. It flows south-southeast for a short distance before turning east and entering a valley, which progressively deepens. The stream turns southeast after several tenths of a mile and its valley continues to deepen. At the bottom of the valley, it turns east and crosses State Route 2003. Almost immediately afterwards, the stream reaches its confluence with Painter Run.

Oxhorn Run joins Painter Run 0.58 miles (0.93 km) upstream of its mouth.

== Hydrology ==
A total of 1.86 miles (2.99 km) of Oxhorn Run is considered to be impaired. The cause of the impairment is atmospheric deposition and pH. This is approximately 4.56 percent of all impaired stream segments in the Sullivan County portion of the West Branch Fishing Creek and East Branch Fishing Creek watersheds.

The entirety of Oxhorn Run does not attain the stream standards of the Pennsylvania Department of Environmental Protection. The stream is the only non-attaining stream in the watershed of Painter Run.

== Geography and geology ==
The elevation near the mouth of Oxhorn Run is 1,430 feet (440 m) above sea level. The elevation of the stream's source is between 2,340 and 2,360 feet (710 and 720 m) above sea level.

A glacial or resedimented till known as the Wisconsinan Till occurs in numerous places throughout the watershed of Oxhorn Run. In the stream's lower reaches, some of the till is underlain by glacial lake clays. Wisconsinan Ice-Contact Stratified Drift and alluvial fan occur in the watershed's lower reaches. The former contains stratified sand and gravel as well as some boulders. The latter contains stratified silt, sand, and gravel with some boulders. Bedrock consisting of sandstone and shale is also found in the watershed.

== Watershed ==
The watershed of Oxhorn Run has an area of 0.87 square miles (2.3 km^{2}). The stream is entirely within the United States Geological Survey quadrangle of Elk Grove.

Oxhorn Run is in the Upper Susquehanna-Lackawanna drainage basin.

== History ==
Oxhorn Run was entered into the Geographic Names Information System on August 2, 1979. Its identifier in the Geographic Names Information System is 1183169.

Oxhorn Run was listed by the United States Environmental Protection Agency as an impaired stream in both 2002 and 2004.

== See also ==
- List of tributaries of Fishing Creek (North Branch Susquehanna River)
