= Bloody Run (West Branch Fishing Creek tributary) =

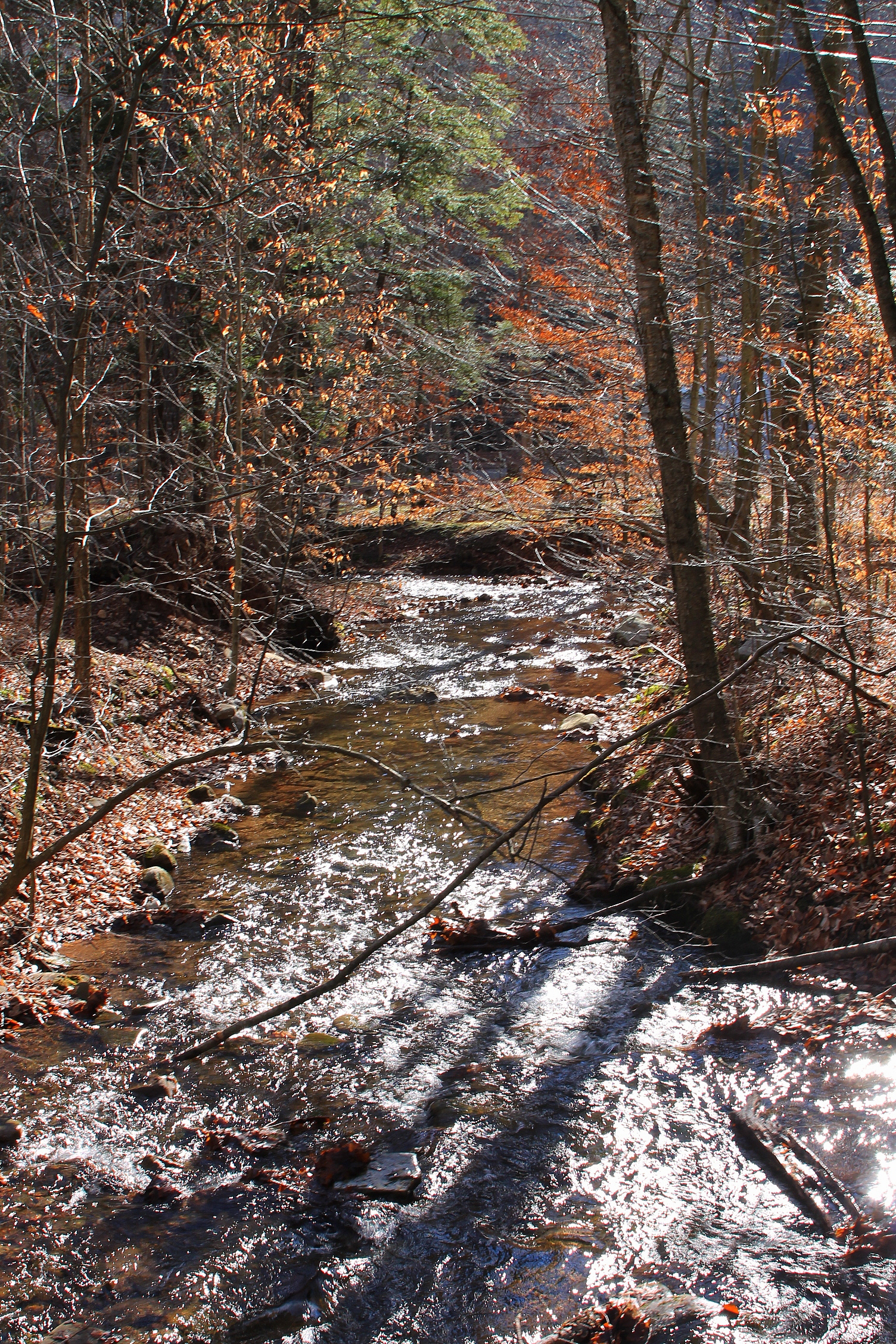
- Bloody Run in its lower reaches
- Etymology: tribute to a legend that John "Hunter John" McHenry killed seven deer in one day on the stream

Physical characteristics
- Source
  - location: plateau in Davidson Township, Sullivan County, Pennsylvania
  - elevation: 2,280–2,300 feet (690–700 m)
- Mouth: West Branch Fishing Creek in Davidson Township, Sullivan County, Pennsylvania
  - coordinates: 41°18′17″N 76°25′11″W
  - elevation: 1,227 ft (374 m)
- Length: 2.9 mi (4.7 km)
- Basin size: 1.30 mi^{2} (3.4 km^{2})

Basin features
- Progression: West Branch Fishing Creek → Fishing Creek → Susquehanna River → Chesapeake Bay

Bloody Run is a tributary of West Branch Fishing Creek in Sullivan County, Pennsylvania, in the United States. It is approximately 2.9 miles (4.7 km) long and flows through Davidson Township. The watershed of the stream has an area of 1.30 square miles (3.4 km^{2}). Various glacial tills and bedrock consisting of sandstone and shale are found in the vicinity of the stream. The stream is designated for use by aquatic life and is a High-Quality Coldwater Fishery.

== Course ==
Bloody Run begins in a valley on a plateau in Davidson Township. It flows south-southeast for a short distance before turning south-southwest. The stream then turns east-southeast for a few tenths of a mile and its valley deepens. It turns south-southeast and then south for approximately two miles (three kilometers) and its valley continues to deepen. The stream then leaves its valley and turns east-southeast for a few tenths of a mile, in the valley of West Branch Fishing Creek. It then reaches its confluence with West Branch Fishing Creek.

Bloody Run joins West Branch Fishing Creek 4.36 miles (7.02 km) upstream of its mouth.

== Geography and geology ==
The elevation near the mouth of Bloody Run is 1,227 feet (374 m) above sea level. The elevation of the stream's source is between 2,280 and 2,300 feet (690 and 700 m) above sea level.

There are riffles on Bloody run.

A glacial till known as the Wisconsinan Bouldery Till can be found in the lower reaches of Bloody Run and in its valley. The stream's upper reaches are in the vicinity of a glacial till known as the Wisconsinan Till. In the stream's middle reaches and on the edges of its valley, there is bedrock consisting of shale and sandstone.

== Watershed ==
The watershed of Bloody Run has an area of 1.30 square miles (3.4 km^{2}). The stream is entirely within the United States Geological Survey quadrangle of Elk Grove.

Bloody Run is in the headwaters of the Fishing Creek watershed. A minor road crosses the stream.

Bloody Run is designated by the Pennsylvania Department of Environmental Protection for use by aquatic life. It attains the Pennsylvania Department of Environmental Protection's standards for this use.

== History and etymology ==
Bloody Run was entered into the Geographic Names Information System on August 2, 1979. Its identifier in the Geographic Names Information System is 1169835.

A concrete slab bridge was constructed over Bloody Run 0.7 miles (1.1 km) west of Elk Grove in 1937. It is 21.0 feet (6.4 m) long and carries State Route 2003. In 1934, a Civilian Conservation Corps opened 5 miles (8.0 km) west of the village of Central, on West Branch Fishing Creek between Bloody Run and Painter Run.

According to legend, John "Hunter John" McHenry killed seven deer near Bloody Run in a single day in the late 1700s. The stream is named as a tribute to McHenry.

== Biology ==
Bloody Run is designated as a High-Quality Coldwater Fishery. Larvae of the species Palaeagapetus celsus have been observed in the vicinity of the stream.

== See also ==
- Elk Run (West Branch Fishing Creek), next tributary of West Branch Fishing Creek going downstream
- Painter Run, next tributary of West Branch Fishing Creek going upstream
- List of tributaries of Fishing Creek (North Branch Susquehanna River)
