= Slip Run (West Branch Fishing Creek tributary) =

Physical characteristics
- Source
  - location: mountain in Davidson Township, Sullivan County, Pennsylvania
  - elevation: between 2,320 and 2,340 feet (710 and 710 m)
- Mouth
  - location: West Branch Fishing Creek in Davidson Township, Sullivan County, Pennsylvania
  - coordinates: 41°19′12″N 76°30′59″W
  - elevation: 1,932 ft (589 m)
- Length: 1.1 mi (1.8 km)
- Basin size: 0.53 sq mi (1.4 km^{2})

Basin features
- Progression: West Branch Fishing Creek → Fishing Creek → Susquehanna River → Chesapeake Bay

Slip Run is a tributary of West Branch Fishing Creek in Sullivan County, Pennsylvania, in the United States. It is approximately 1.1 miles (1.8 km) long and flows through Davidson Township. The watershed of the stream has an area of 0.53 square miles (1.4 km^{2}). Wild trout naturally reproduce within the stream. Surficial geology in the area mainly consists of alluvium, Boulder Colluvium, Wisconsinan Till Moraine, Wisconsinan Till, and bedrock consisting of sandstone and shale.

== Course ==
Slip Run begins on a mountain in Davidson Township. It flows east-southeast for a few tenths of a mile before turning south-southeast and entering a valley. Approximately a mile (two kilometers) further downstream, the stream reaches its confluence with West Branch Fishing Creek not far from Fishing Creek Road.

Slip Run joins West Branch Fishing Creek 10.26 miles (16.51 km) upstream of its mouth.

== Geography and geology ==
The elevation near the mouth of Slip Run is 1,932 feet (589 m) above sea level. However, the elevation of the stream's source is between 2,320 and 2,340 feet (710 and 710 m) above sea level. The stream is on the northern side of North Mountain.

The geology in the vicinity of Slip Run has been affected by glaciation and the Wisconsinan Terminus crosses its watershed. There are a number of arcuate till ridges in the vicinity of Slip Run. Conglomerate erratics also occur to the west of the stream's valley.

The surficial geology at the mouth of Slip Run consists of alluvium and Boulder Colluvium, which contains numerous boulders made of sandstone, conglomerate, and quartz. Further upstream, the surficial geology features bedrock consisting of sandstone and shale, with Boulder Colluvium occurring on a nearby upland. A large patch of Wisconsinan Till Moraine occurs along the upper reaches of the stream, and beyond it there is Wisconsinan Till.

== Watershed and biology ==
The watershed of Slip Run has an area of 0.53 square miles (1.4 km^{2}). The stream is entirely within the United States Geological Survey quadrangle of Sonestown. Its entire length is in the western portion of Pennsylvania State Game Lands Number 13, with the exception of its headwaters, which are not in any state game lands.

Wild trout naturally reproduce in Slip Run from its headwaters downstream to its mouth.

== History ==
Slip Run was entered into the Geographic Names Information System on August 2, 1979. Its identifier in the Geographic Names Information System is 1187819.

== See also ==
- Hemlock Run, next tributary of West Branch Fishing Creek going downstream
- Swanks Run, next tributary of West Branch Fishing Creek going upstream
- List of tributaries of Fishing Creek (North Branch Susquehanna River)
- List of rivers of Pennsylvania
