= Deep Hollow (West Branch Fishing Creek tributary) =

- Etymology: named after the valley through which it flows

Physical characteristics
- Source
  - location: valley on a plateau in Davidson Township, Luzerne County, Pennsylvania
  - elevation: just over 2,340 feet (710 m)
- Mouth
  - location: West Branch Fishing Creek in Davidson Township, Luzerne County, Pennsylvania
  - coordinates: 41°18′35″N 76°28′56″W
  - elevation: 1,657 ft (505 m)
- Length: 0.8 mi (1.3 km)
- Basin size: 0.53 mi^{2} (1.4 km^{2})

Basin features
- Progression: West Branch Fishing Creek → Fishing Creek → Susquehanna River → Chesapeake Bay

Deep Hollow is a tributary of West Branch Fishing Creek in Luzerne County, Pennsylvania, in the United States. It is approximately 0.8 miles (1.3 km) long and flows through Davidson Township. The watershed of the stream has an area of 0.53 square miles (1.4 km^{2}). Wild trout naturally reproduce in the stream. The surficial geology in the area mainly features bedrock consisting of sandstone and shale, as well as a small amount of Boulder Colluvium and alluvium.

== Course ==
Deep Hollow begins in a valley on a plateau in Davidson Township. It flows south-southeast for several tenths of a mile and its valley becomes much deeper. The stream then turns south-southwest for a few tenths of a mile. It then turns south-southeast again, crossing Fishing Creek Road and reaching its confluence with West Branch Fishing Creek.

Deep Hollow joins West Branch Fishing Creek 8.24 miles (13.26 km) upstream of its mouth.

== Geography and geology ==
The elevation near the mouth of Deep Hollow is 1,657 feet (505 m) above sea level. The elevation near the stream's source is just over 2,340 feet (710 m) above sea level.

Nearly all of the surficial geology in the valley of Deep Hollow is on bedrock consisting of sandstone and shale. However, near its mouth, there is an area of alluvium and Boulder Colluvium. Alluvium contains stratified sand, silt, and gravel, as well as some boulders. Boulder Colluvium mainly contains boulders made of quartz, sandstone, or conglomerate.

The Pennsylvania Game Commission has a permit to maintain a bridge over Deep Hollow. The bridge has a span of 10 feet (3.0 m) and the waterway opening underneath has an area of 5 square feet (0.46 m^{2}). It is a wood plank bridge with stone abutment walls.

== Watershed and biology ==
The watershed of Deep Hollow has an area of 0.53 square miles (1.4 km^{2}). The stream is entirely within the United States Geological Survey quadrangle of Elk Grove.

Wild trout naturally reproduce in Deep Hollow from its headwaters downstream to its mouth.

== History and etymology ==
Deep Hollow was entered into the Geographic Names Information System on August 2, 1979. Its identifier in the Geographic Names Information System is 1173064. The stream is unnamed and instead takes the name of the valley that it flows through.

== See also ==
- Shingle Mill Run, next tributary of West Branch Fishing Creek going downstream
- Laurel Run (West Branch Fishing Creek), next tributary of West Branch Fishing Creek going upstream
- List of tributaries of Fishing Creek (North Branch Susquehanna River)
- List of rivers of Pennsylvania
