= Swanks Run =

Physical characteristics
- Source
  - location: plateau in Davidson Township, Sullivan County, Pennsylvania
  - elevation: between 2,240 and 2,260 feet (680 and 690 m)
- Mouth
  - location: West Branch Fishing Creek in Davidson Township, Sullivan County, Pennsylvania
  - coordinates: 41°19′08″N 76°31′23″W
  - elevation: 1,978 ft (603 m)
- Length: 1.5 mi (2.4 km)
- Basin size: 1.33 sq mi (3.4 km^{2})

Basin features
- Progression: West Branch Fishing Creek → Fishing Creek → Susquehanna River → Chesapeake Bay
- Tributaries
  - left: one unnamed tributary

Swanks Run is a tributary of West Branch Fishing Creek in Sullivan County, Pennsylvania, in the United States. It is approximately 1.5 miles (2.4 km) long and flows through Davidson Township. The watershed of the stream has an area of 1.33 square miles (3.4 km^{2}). The stream is considered to be Class A Wild Trout Waters for its entire length. Boulder Colluvium, alluvium, and bedrock consisting of sandstone and shale can be found in the vicinity of the stream. It is on Pennsylvania State Game Lands.

== Course ==
Swanks Run begins on a plateau in Davidson Township. It flows east for several tenths of a mile, entering a small and narrow valley. It then receives an unnamed tributary from the left and turns southeast. Its valley becomes deeper as it flows downstream. After several tenths of a mile, the stream reaches its confluence with West Branch Fishing Creek.

Swanks Run joins West Branch Fishing Creek 10.64 miles (17.12 km) upstream of its mouth.

=== Tributaries ===
Swanks Run has no named tributaries. However, it does have one unnamed tributary, which is slightly less than half a mile long and flows in a north-to-south direction.

== Hydrology, geography, and geology ==
The concentration of alkalinity in the waters of Swanks Run is one milligram per liter.

The elevation near the mouth of Swanks Run is 1,978 feet (603 m) above sea level. The elevation of the stream's source is between 2,240 and 2,260 feet (680 and 690 m) above sea level.

Swanks Run is on bedrock consisting of sandstone and shale for nearly its entire length. However, near the mouth of the stream, there is alluvium containing stratified silt, sand, and gravel, as well as some boulders. Additionally, a colluvium known as Boulder Colluvium occurs near the stream's mouth and also in the higher portions of the watershed, above the stream's valley. In these areas, the majority of the surface is covered in boulders and cobbles consisting of quartz, sandstone, or conglomerate.

== Watershed ==
The watershed of Swanks Run has an area of 1.33 square miles (3.4 km^{2}). The stream is entirely within the United States Geological Survey quadrangle of Sonestown.

Swanks Run is on public and open land for its entire length. The stream is in the western part of Pennsylvania State Game Lands Number 13.

== History ==
Swanks Run was entered into the Geographical Names Information System on August 2, 1979. Its identifier in the Geographical Names Information System is 1189137.

== Biology ==
Swanks Run is considered by the Pennsylvania Fish and Boat Commission to be Class A Wild Trout Waters for brook trout. The stream holds this designation between its headwaters and its mouth. It is one of six streams to be designated as Class A Wild Trout Waters in Sullivan County.

== See also ==
- Slip Run (West Branch Fishing Creek), next tributary of West Branch Fishing Creek going downstream
- List of tributaries of Fishing Creek (North Branch Susquehanna River)
- List of rivers of Pennsylvania
