= Big Run (West Branch Fishing Creek tributary) =

Physical characteristics
- Source
  - location: plateau in Davidson Township, Sullivan County, Pennsylvania
  - elevation: between 2,240 and 2,260 feet (680 and 690 m)
- Mouth
  - location: West Branch Fishing Creek in Davidson Township, Sullivan County, Pennsylvania
  - coordinates: 41°17′57″N 76°27′24″W
  - elevation: 1,434 ft (437 m)
- Length: 1.0 mi (1.6 km)
- Basin size: 0.51 mi^{2} (1.3 km^{2})

Basin features
- Progression: West Branch Fishing Creek → Fishing Creek → Susquehanna River → Chesapeake Bay

Big Run is a tributary of West Branch Fishing Creek in Sullivan County, Pennsylvania, in the United States. It is approximately 1.0 mile (1.6 km) long and flows through Davidson Township. The watershed of the stream has an area of 0.51 square miles (1.3 km^{2}). The stream is somewhat acidic, with a pH that ranged from 4.02 to 4.65 during a study on the watershed of Fishing Creek. Wisconsinan Till, Boulder Colluvium, and bedrock consisting of sandstone and shale all occur in the vicinity of the stream.

== Course ==
Big Run begins on a plateau in Davidson Township. It flows southeast and almost immediately leaves the plateau and begins descending steeply through a deep and narrow valley. After several tenths of a mile, the stream gradually turns south. A short distance further downstream, it crosses Fishing Creek Road and reaches its confluence with West Branch Fishing Creek.

Big Run joins West Branch Fishing Creek 6.44 miles (10.36 km) upstream of its mouth.

== Hydrology ==
Between June 2010 and April 2011, the water temperature of Big Run was measured four times during a study of the Fishing Creek watershed. The highest temperature, 59.0 °F (15.0 °C) occurred on June 18, 2010 and the second-highest temperature, 41.1 °F (5.1 °C), occurred on November 13, 2010. The second-lowest temperature occurred, 39.7 °F (4.3 °C) on April 9, 2011. The lowest temperature, 32.3 °F (0.2 °C), occurred on January 4, 2011.

Between June 2010 and April 2011, the specific conductivity of the waters of Big Run was measured four times during the study of the Fishing Creek watershed . The highest specific conductivity was 20 micro-siemens per centimeter. This value occurred on June 18, 2010. The lowest specific conductivity occurred on January 4, 2011. The value was 6 micro-siemens per centimeter. The specific conductivity was 15 micro-siemens per centimeter on November 13, 2010 and April 9, 2011.

The pH of Big Run was measured four times during the study of the Fishing Creek watershed between June 2010 and April 2011. The highest pH was 4.65 and it occurred on November 13, 2010. The second-highest pH was 4.37. This value occurred on June 18, 2010. The second-lowest was 4.13 and occurred on January 4, 2011. The lowest pH, 4.02, occurred on April 9, 2011.

Big Run is designated by the Pennsylvania Department of Environmental Protection for use for aquatic life. It attains the Pennsylvania Department of Environmental Protection's standards for this use.

== Geography, geology, and watershed ==
The elevation near the mouth of Big Run is 1,434 feet (437 m) above sea level. The elevation of the stream's source is between 2,240 and 2,260 feet (680 and 690 m) above sea level.

In its lower reaches, Big Run is on a glacial till known as the Wisconsinan Till. This till is a diamict that is unstratified or poorly stratified. In part of the area where the stream is in the vicinity of Wisconsinan Till, the till is underlain by alternating layers of silt and clay. Each layer is approximately 1 inch (2.5 cm) thick. Boulder Colluvium occurs near the stream's headwaters. The majority of the surface is covered in boulders consisting of quartz, sandstone, or conglomerate. Bedrock consisting of sandstone and shale can be found in the vicinity of the stream, especially in its middle and upper reaches.

The watershed of Big Run has an area of 0.51 square miles (1.3 km^{2}). The stream is entirely within the United States Geological Survey quadrangle of Elk Grove.

== History ==
Big Run was entered into the Geographic Names Information System on August 2, 1979. Its identifier in the Geographic Names Information System is 1169569.

== See also ==
- Painter Run, next tributary of West Branch Fishing Creek going downstream
- Shingle Mill Run, next tributary of West Branch Fishing Creek going upstream
