= West Branch Fishing Creek =

Tributary in Fishing Creek, Pennsylvania

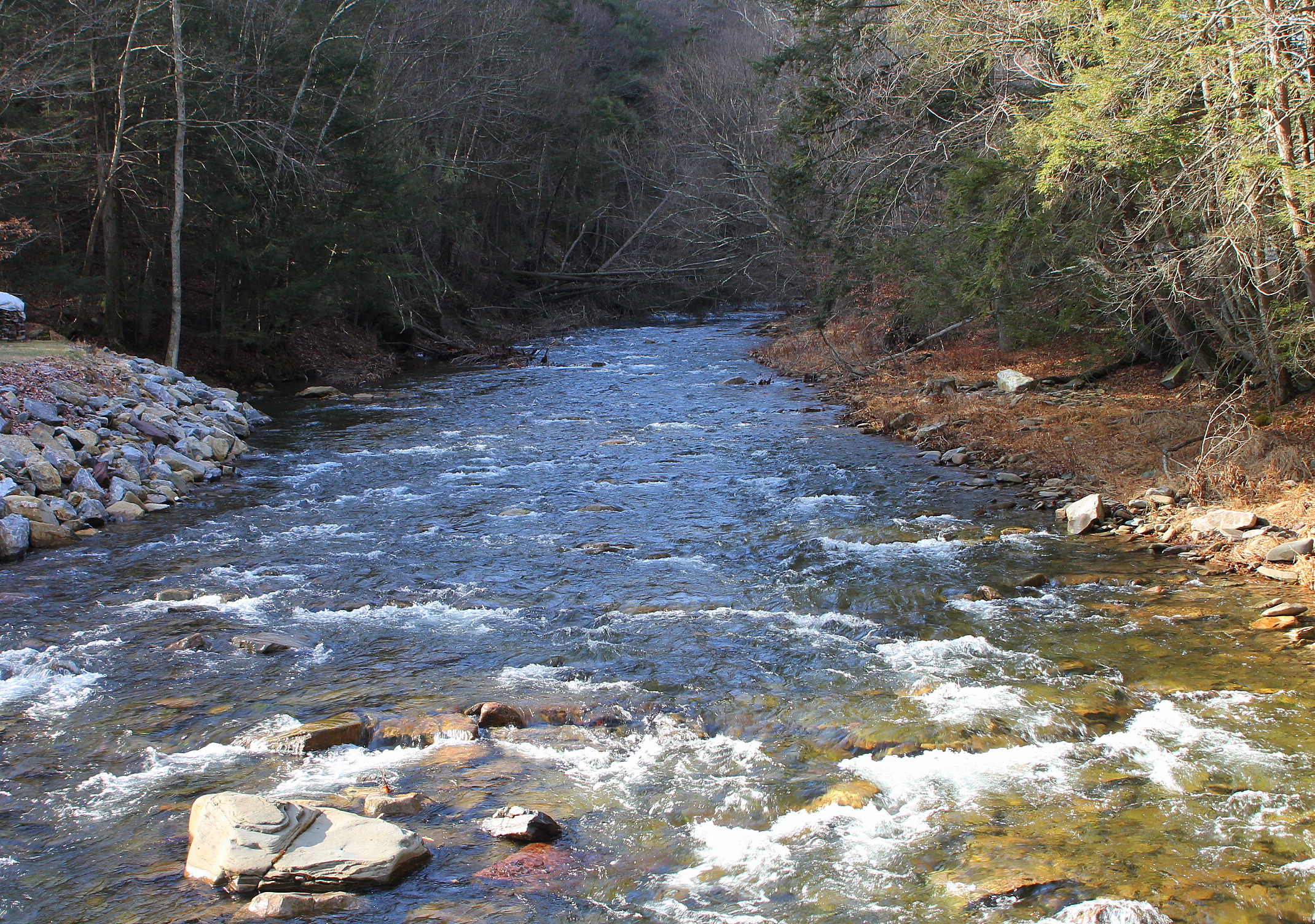
- West Branch Fishing Creek near Elk Grove, looking upstream

Physical characteristics
- Source
  - location: Huckleberry Mountain in Davidson Township, Sullivan County, Pennsylvania
- Mouth
  - location: Fishing Creek in Sugarloaf Township, Columbia County, Pennsylvania
  - coordinates: 41°16′33″N 76°22′26″W
- Length: 11.1 mi (17.9 km)
- Basin size: 33.5 sq mi (87 km^{2})
- Discharge
  - average: 0 to 25 cubic metres per second (0 to 883 cu ft/s)

Basin features
- Tributaries
  - left: Swanks Run, Slip Run, Hemlock Run, Laurel Run, Deep Hollow, Big Run, Painter Run, Bloody Run, Elk Run, Peterman Run, Rough Run
  - right: Shingle Mill Run

West Branch Fishing Creek is one of the northernmost major tributaries of Fishing Creek in Sullivan County, Pennsylvania and Columbia County, Pennsylvania, in the United States. It is 11.1 miles (17.9 km) long and flows through Davidson Township, Sullivan County and Sugarloaf Township, Columbia County. The creek's watershed has an area of 33.5 square miles, nearly all of which is forested land.

Rock formations in the watershed of West Branch Fishing Creek include the Catskill Formation, the Huntley Mountain Formation, and the Burgoon Sandstone. North Mountain, Huckleberry Mountain, and Central Mountain are all in the creek's vicinity. The temperature of the creek's waters ranges from −2 °C (28 °F) to 23 °C (73 °F) and its pH ranges from approximately 5.5 to just under 7.0. The creek's discharge ranges from nearly 0 cubic meters per second to approximately 25 cubic meters per second.

Communities in the watershed of West Branch Fishing Creek include Central and Elk Grove. Lumbering was an industry in the watershed in the late 1800s. Fish species living in West Branch Fishing Creek include brown trout, brook trout, and sculpin. The upper reaches of the creek are designated as Class A Wild Trout Waters by the Pennsylvania Fish and Boat Commission. There is significant benthic algae coverage in the lower reaches of the creek.

== Course ==
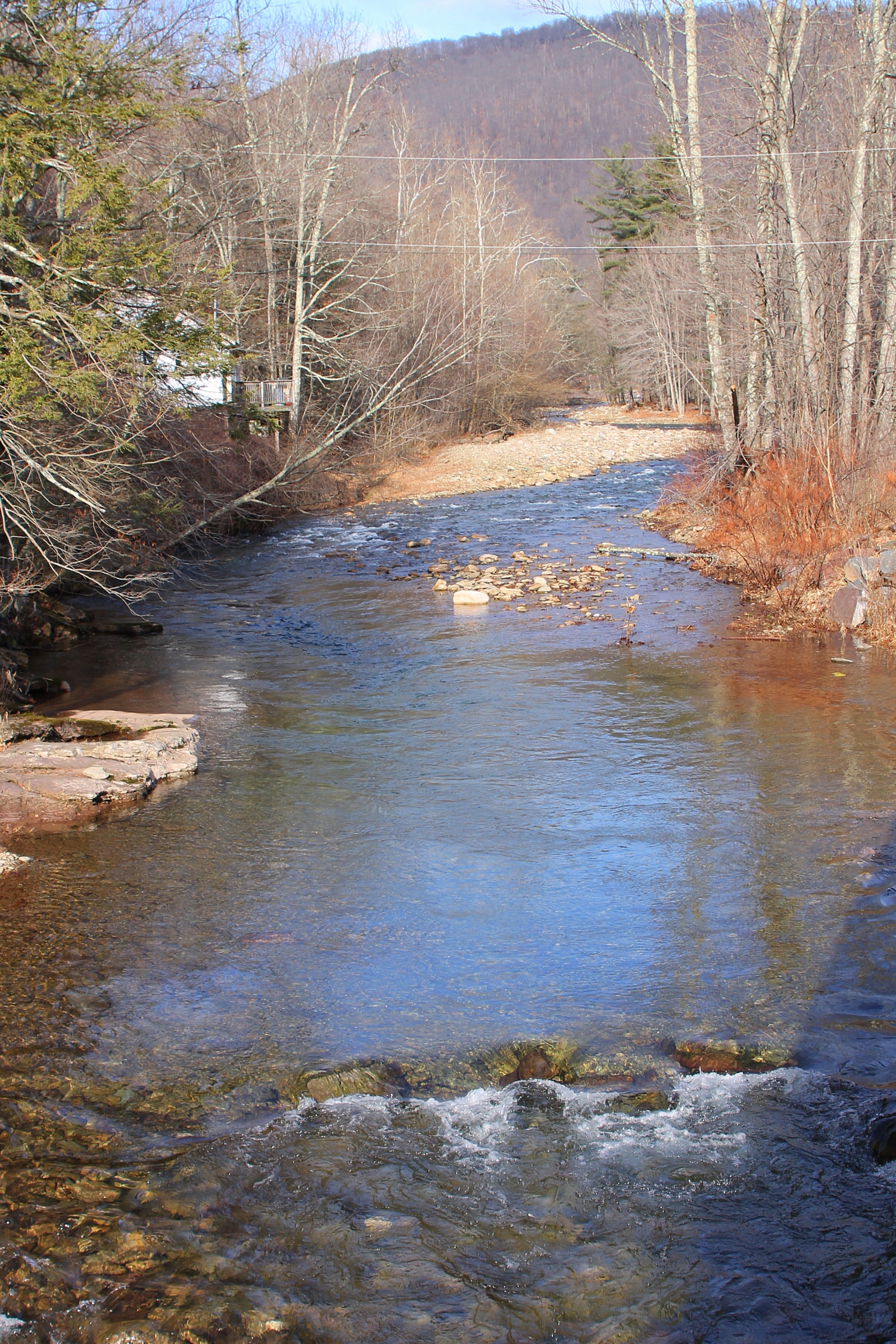
West Branch Fishing Creek

West Branch Fishing Creek begins in Pennsylvania State Game Lands Number 13 and southwestern Davidson Township, Sullivan County on Huckleberry Mountain. It flows northeast, almost immediately entering a valley. It soon picks up the tributaries Swanks Run and Slip Run from the left and turns southeast, its valley becoming progressively deeper. The creek continues southeast, flowing between Huckleberry Mountain and North Mountain. It picks up two more tributaries from the left and then picks up its first tributary from the right, Shingle Mill Run. Shortly afterwards, the creek turns east and begins receiving unnamed tributaries from both sides. After a few miles, Painter Run flows into the creek. The creek exits Davidson Township and Sullivan County shortly downstream.

Upon leaving Sullivan County, West Branch Fishing Creek enters Sugarloaf Township, Columbia County. Immediately after entering Columbia County, the creek flows through the community of Elk Grove. It flows east-southeast for a short distance before reaching the communities of Central and Jamison City. The creek then makes a sharp turn south and flows between Central Mountain and Huckleberry Mountain and into a plain. After some distance, it turns southwest and crosses Pennsylvania Route 118. Several hundred feet downstream, it and East Branch Fishing Creek merge to form Fishing Creek.

== Hydrology ==
During dry years, such as 2001, 2002, 2005, 2007, 2008, and 2010, parts of West Branch Fishing Creek run dry for an average of 107 days in a year. During wet years, such as 2003, 2004, 2006, and 2009, the creek only runs dry for 5 days per year on average. In June 2010, 0.9 miles (1.4 km) of the stream bed were found to be completely dry. The discharge of the creek usually ranges from slightly above 0 to 5 cubic meters per second. However, it is sometimes between 5 and 10 cubic meters per second and occasionally is as high as 25 cubic meters per second.

Between May 2010 and July 2011, the lowest water temperatures occurred in West Branch Fishing Creek in January and February 2011. The temperature was approximately −1 °C (30 °F) or −2 °C (28 °F). The temperature was over 20 °C (68 °F) in July 2010, with a maximum of 22 °C (72 °F) or 23 °C (73 °F). The temperature was nearly 20 °C (68 °F) in June 2010 and September 2010.

From May 2010 to July 2011, the concentration of dissolved oxygen ranged from slightly over 6 milligrams per liter to nearly 17 milligrams per liter. For comparison, the minimum threshold for optimal fish habitation is 5 milligrams per liter. In the aforementioned time period, the lowest concentration occurred in May 2010. The second-lowest concentration, approximately 7 milligrams per liter, occurred in June 2010. The concentration of dissolved oxygen in the creek was nearly 17 milligrams per liter in January 2011 and February 2011. The creek has the third-lowest minimum concentration of dissolved oxygen of all named streams in the upper Fishing Creek watershed, including Fishing Creek itself.

West Branch Fishing Creek experiences more severe episodic acidification than any stream in the upper Fishing Creek watershed except for possibly East Branch Fishing Creek. The pH of West Branch Fishing Creek ranges from just over 5.5 to just under 7.0. The alkalinity concentration of the creek in its upper reaches has been measured to be 2 milligrams per liter (0.0020 oz/cu ft). The concentration of dissolved aluminum in the creek is usually less than 40 milligrams per liter and is in some cases nearly 0 milligrams per liter. The maximum concentration of dissolved aluminum in the creek is 60 to 70 milligrams per liter, which is below the threshold for toxicity.

The conductivity of West Branch Fishing Creek ranges from less than 20 to nearly 60 micro-siemens per centimeter.

== Geology ==
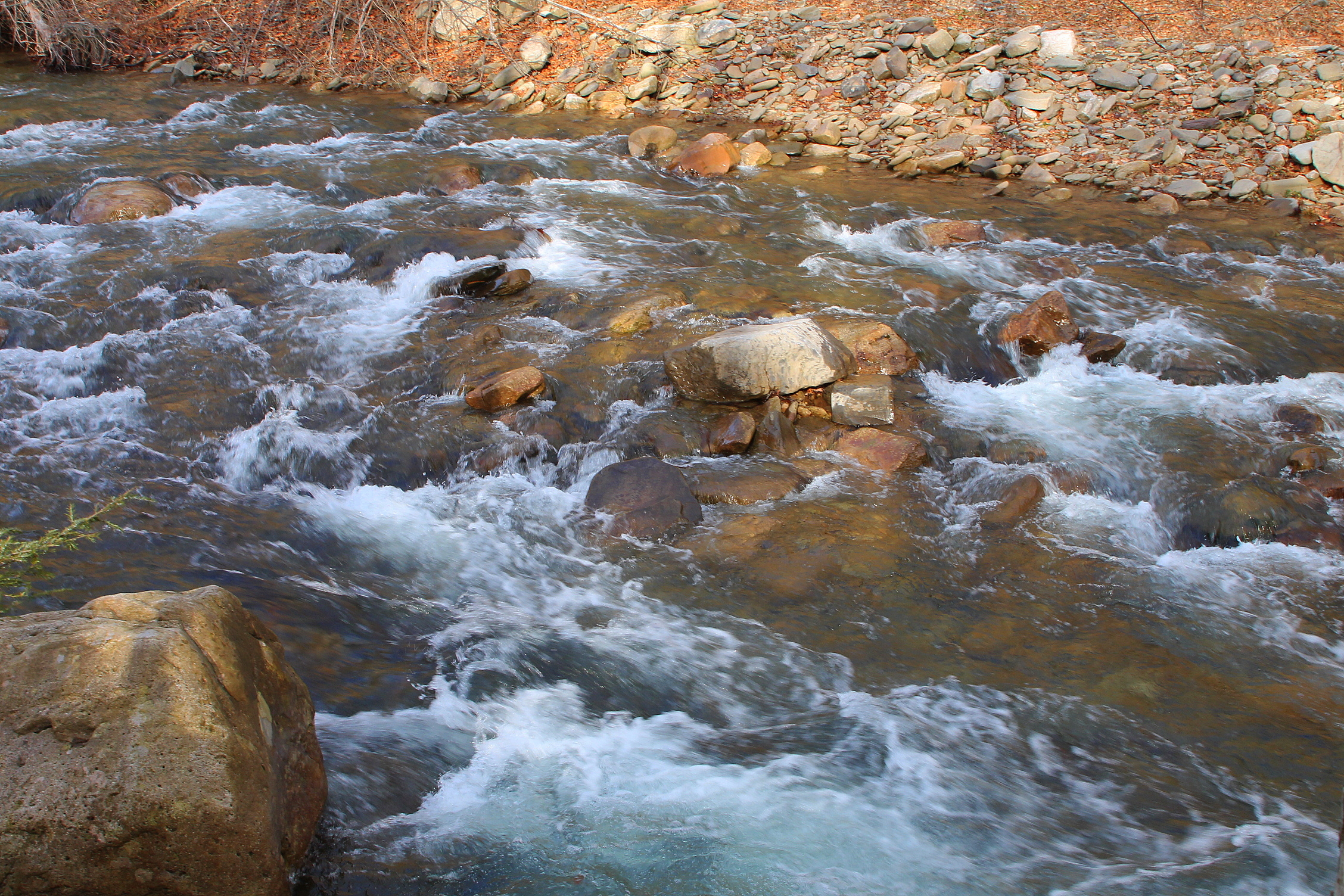
Rapids on West Branch Fishing Creek

Nearly all of the watershed of West Branch Fishing Creek is in the Appalachian Plateau physiographic province's Deep Valley Section. However, the lowest reaches of it, south of Pennsylvania Route 118, are in the Susquehanna Lowlands section of the ridge and valley physiographic province.

The main rock formations in the area of West Branch Fishing Creek are the Catskill Formation, the Huntley Mountain Formation, and the Burgoon Sandstone. These formations are all primarily made of sandstone, but also contain conglomerate, shale, and siltstone. They were formed during the Devonian, Mississippian and Devonian, and the Mississippian, respectively. The Catskill Formation is mostly found in the lower and middle reaches of the watershed, along the creek and its tributaries. The Huntley Mountain Formation is found in the upper reaches of the watershed and on some of the streams in that part of the watershed. The Burgoon Sandstone is found in the watershed, but not on many of its streams.

The soils in the watershed of West Branch Fishing Creek are acidic because of a lack of limestone.

The West Branch Fishing Creek watershed, along with the rest of the upper Fishing Creek watershed, experienced glaciation during the Ice Age. There is a small moraine in the valley of Hemlock Run, a tributary of West Branch Fishing Creek. The valley of the creek is a gorge, which is one of the main features of the western part of Pennsylvania State Game Lands #13.

== Watershed ==
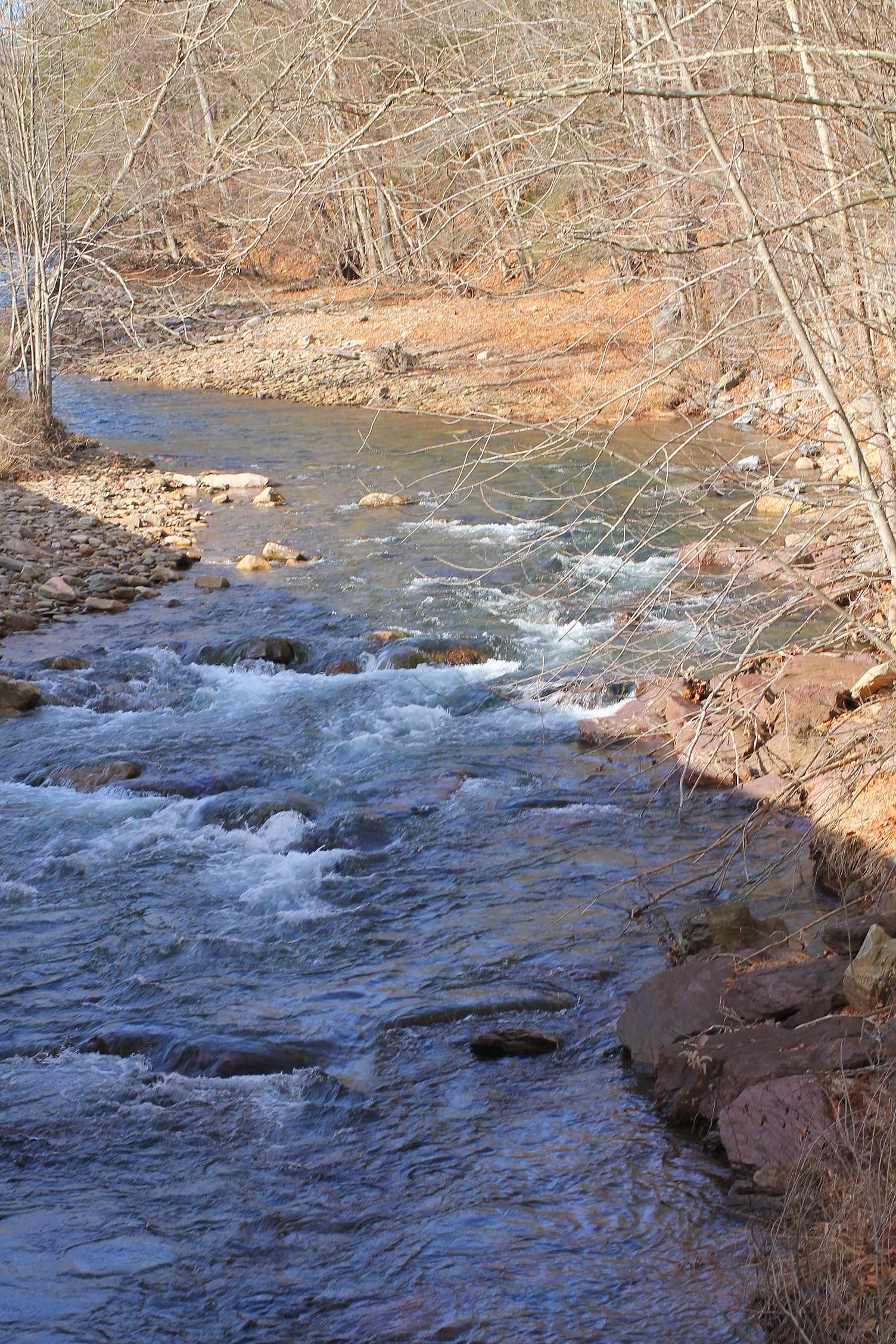
West Branch Fishing Creek from State Route 4049

The watershed of West Branch Fishing Creek has an area of 33.5 square miles. The watershed has a drainage density of 1.3 per mile. The entire watershed is 12.5 miles (20.1 km) long. The vast majority of the watershed is forested, with the only urban areas being the communities of Central and Elk Grove. There are a small number of residential areas and seasonal cabins in the watershed.

The watershed of West Branch Fishing Creek contains a number of sub-watersheds. The largest of these is the watershed of Elk Run, which has an area of 7.49 square miles and joins the creek 3.64 miles (5.86 km) from its mouth. The second-largest sub-watershed is that of Painter Run. It has an area of 5.2 square miles and joins the creek 6.12 miles (9.85 km) upstream of its mouth. Both of these sub-watersheds are on the northern side of West Branch Fishing Creek's main stem.

== History ==
The community of Emmons was founded on West Branch Fishing Creek 5 miles (8.0 km) west of Jamison City by George R. Baum, who constructed a sawmill there. At the time, it was known as Baumstown. The mill was destroyed in a flood in 1850. The area remained uninhabited until industrial lumbering began in 1882.

In September 1864, a thousand soldiers of the United States Army searched the valley of West Branch Fishing Creek as far as the Sullivan County line for an alleged fortress manned by 500 armed deserters and draft evaders. However, they were unable to find the fortress or any deserters.

The community of Elk Grove is located on West Branch Fishing Creek approximately 1.0 mile (1.6 km) upstream of the community of Central. It was established sometime before 1915. In 1915 the community had twelve homes and a hotel known as the Elk Grove Hotel. Historically the Pentecost Lumber Company engaged in lumbering in the area of the creek and built a railroad line from the Bloomsburg and Sullivan Railroad at Central several miles upstream, to a point at Emmons. The Pentecost Lumber Company shipped both bark and timber to Jamison City.

== Biology ==
The drainage basin of West Branch Fishing Creek is designated as a High-Quality Coldwater Fishery and a Migratory Fishery, except for the drainage basins of the tributaries Shingle Mill Run and Elk Run, which are designated as Exceptional Value waters and Migratory Fisheries. Wild trout naturally reproduce in the creek. However, dry stream beds often prevent wild brook trout from migrating up the creek. Nevertheless, the creek has the highest population of wild brook trout of any major stream in the upper Fishing Creek watershed. In an electrofishing survey done by the Fishing Creek Sportsman Association, 17 sculpin, 11 wild brook trout, 7 escaped (and unidentified) trout, 6 hatchery brown trout, and 1 hatchery brook trout were observed on the creek. The creek is designated by the Pennsylvania Fish and Boat Commission as Class A Wild Trout Waters from its source to the tributary Hemlock Run, a distance of 2.50 miles (4.02 km).

A location on West Branch Fishing Creek downstream of the community of Elk Grove is one of two places in the watershed of upper Fishing Creek where the stream bed is more than 60% covered by benthic algae. The high population of algae here is possibly due to leaking septic tanks in the area. In Elk Grove, there are between 100 and 200 aquatic macroinvertebrates per square meter in the creek. Further upstream, there are nearly 300 aquatic macroinvertebrates per square meter. At the headwaters of the creek, approximately 25% of the macroinvertebrate taxa belong to the order Plecoptera, about 25% belong to the order Ephemeroptera, approximately 25% belong to the order Trichoptera, about 20% belong to the order Chironomidae, and roughly 5% belong to other orders. At the creek's mouth, approximately 20% of the macroinvertebrate taxa are in the order Plecoptera, approximately 55% belong to the order Ephemeroptera, roughly 20% are in the orders Trichoptera and Chironomidae. Approximately 5% are in other orders.

Woody detritus can be found on West Branch Fishing Creek. The creek's riparian buffer is unfragmented.

In 2011, the habitat quality of upper Fishing Creek and its tributaries were rated on a scale of 1 to 200 (with a higher rating indicating better habitability) by Point Park University and the Fishing Creek Sportsmans' Association. The headwaters of West Branch Fishing Creek had a score of 191, tying West Creek for the highest-rated site in the upper Fishing Creek watershed. Most of West Branch Fishing Creek received a rating between 166 and 200, indicating optimal habitat quality. The lower reaches of the creek, however, received a rating of 113 to 165, indicating suboptimal habitat quality.

The Shannon Diversity Index of West Branch Fishing Creek is between 2.0 and 2.5 at Elk Grove. Further upstream, the Shannon Diversity Index of the creek is approximately 2.8. In the lower reaches of the creek, downstream of Painter Run, its Hilsenhoff Biotic Index is between 2.6 and 3.5. Between Shingle Mill Run and Painter Run, West Branch Fishing Creek's Hilsenhoff Biotic Index is between 1.6 and 2.5.

== See also ==
- East Branch Fishing Creek
- Coles Creek (Pennsylvania), next tributary of Fishing Creek going downstream
- List of tributaries of Fishing Creek (North Branch Susquehanna River)
