= Laurel Run (West Branch Fishing Creek tributary) =

Physical characteristics
- Source
  - location: valley in Davidson Township, Sullivan County, Pennsylvania
  - elevation: between 2,260 and 2,280 feet (690 and 690 m)
- Mouth
  - location: West Branch Fishing Creek in Davidson Township, Sullivan County, Pennsylvania
  - coordinates: 41°18′43″N 76°29′14″W
  - elevation: 1,657 ft (505 m)
- Length: 1.2 mi (1.9 km)

Basin features
- Progression: West Branch Fishing Creek → Fishing Creek → Susquehanna River → Chesapeake Bay

Laurel Run is a tributary of West Branch Fishing Creek in Sullivan County, Pennsylvania, in the United States. It is approximately 1.2 miles (1.9 km) long and flows through Davidson Township. The stream is in the United States Geological Survey quadrangle of Elk Grove. Wisconsinan Flow-Till, Boulder Colluvium, Wisconsinan Till Moraine, alluvium, and alluvial fan occur in the vicinity of the stream, as does bedrock consisting of sandstone and shale. The southern terminus of the late Wisconsinan glaciation is also in the area. A wood plank bridge on stone masonry abutment walls crosses the stream.

== Course ==
Laurel Run begins in a valley in Davidson Township. It flows south for several hundred feet before turning southeast for a few tenths of a mile. The stream then turns south for a similar distance before turning southeast again and exiting the valley. It crosses Fishing Creek Road and a short distance later, reaches its confluence with West Branch Fishing Creek.

Laurel Run joins West Branch Fishing Creek 8.54 miles (13.74 km) upstream of its mouth.

== Geography and geology ==
The elevation near the mouth of Laurel Run is 1,657 feet (505 m) above sea level. The elevation of the stream's source is between 2,260 and 2,280 feet (690 and 690 m) above sea level.

A glacial till known as the Wisconsinan Flow-Till occurs in the valley of Laurel Run. This is the only place in the United States Geological Survey quadrangle of Elk Grove where that type of glacial till occurs. It is a resedimented till that is texturally a diamict. This glacial till occurs in the upper reaches of the bottom of the stream's valley. Boulder Colluvium occurs in the lower reaches of the valley and contains boulders consisting of quartz, sandstone, and conglomerate. Wisconsinan Till Moraine and a glacial or resedimented till known as the Wisconsinan Till occur in the upper reaches of the stream's watershed. Alluvium and alluvial fan occur near its mouth. The sides of the stream's valley contain bedrock consisting of sandstone and shale.

The terminus of the glaciers during the late Wisconsinan glaciation bulged out in a small lobe near where the headwaters of Laurel Run are currently located.

== Watershed ==
Laurel Run is entirely within the United States Geological Survey quadrangle of Elk Grove.

There is a bridge that crosses Laurel Run and the Pennsylvania Game Commission has a permit to maintain it. The bridge is a wood plank bridge on abutment walls made of stone masonry. It has a span of 10 feet (3.0 m) and the opening that the stream passes through has an area of 65 square feet (6 square meters).

== History ==
Laurel Run was entered into the Geographic Names Information System on August 2, 1979. Its identifier in the Geographic Names Information System is 1209307.

== See also ==
- Deep Hollow (West Branch Fishing Creek), next tributary of West Branch Fishing Creek going downstream
- Hemlock Run, next tributary of West Branch Fishing Creek going upstream
- List of tributaries of Fishing Creek (North Branch Susquehanna River)
