= John Gosse Freeze =

American lawyer

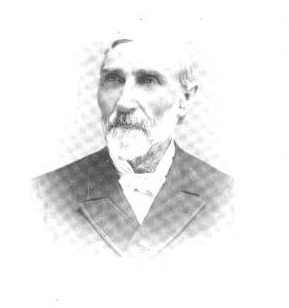
- John Gosse Freeze as pictured in J.H. Beers' Historical and Biographical Annals of Columbia and Montour Counties, Pennsylvania
- Born: November 4, 1825; Montoursville, Pennsylvania, US
- Died: July 8, 1913 (aged 87); Bloomsburg, Pennsylvania, US
- Occupation: Lawyer
- Years active: 1848 to 1900s or 1910s
- Known for: Prominent figure in 19th-century Columbia County
- Notable work: History of Columbia County (1876), A Royal Pastoral and other Poems (1883), A History of Columbia County, Pennsylvania: From the Earliest Times (1888)

John Gosse Freeze (November 4, 1825 – July 8, 1913) was an American lawyer and writer. He was born in Montoursville and attended both private and common schools. After school, he briefly worked as a schoolteacher before turning to law in 1846. He was admitted to the bar of Columbia County in 1848 and served as a lawyer for more than 60 years. He was also the register and recorder of Columbia County from 1863 to 1869 and was on the staff of Pennsylvania governor William Bigler. Freeze wrote a book of poetry and two volumes of county history. He married in 1854 and had five children, but none lived past the age of 24.

== Family ==
Freeze's ancestors originally resided in Germany or the Low Countries, but moved to the United States well before the American Revolutionary War. His ancestors settled in New Jersey, from where his grandfather relocated to Pennsylvania. Freeze's paternal grandfather, Peter Freeze, fought in the militia in the American Revolutionary War.

== Early life and education ==
Freeze was born in the community of Montoursville at the mouth of Loyalsock Creek in Lycoming County, Pennsylvania on November 4, 1825. He was the eldest of eight children. His parents were Frances (Gosse) Freeze and James Freeze, a miller.

In addition to attending common schools, Freeze also attended private schools such as the Milton Academy and the Danville Academy. While at school, he learned various subjects, including Latin and Greek. His father also hired private tutors for him. J.H. Beers described Freeze as having "the best educational facilities this region afforded in his day" in his 1915 book Historical and Biographical Annals of Columbia and Montour Counties, Pennsylvania.

== Legal career ==
Freeze briefly worked as a schoolteacher in the early 1840s, while under the age of 17. However, he eventually decided to practice law. He became a student-at-law under Joshua W. Cromley in Danville in 1846. He was admitted into the bar of Columbia County on April 19, 1848. Freeze served in this capacity for more than sixty years before retiring only shortly before his death.

In the early part of Freeze's career, he was mainly involved in lawsuits over land titles, especially those concerning the coal mining lands in southern Columbia County. He played a role in the Longenberger-McReynolds and Biggs-Doebler cases, which started in 1863 and continued until 1885.

Freeze was also active in homicide trials. He defended Hester, Tully, and McHugh in a Molly Maguires trial of 1877. The three men had been charged with the murder of Alexander Rea. Although all three were convicted and hanged, Freeze remained convinced that only Hester was guilty of the murder.

J.H. Beers' 1915 book Historical and Biographical Annals of Columbia and Montour Counties, Pennsylvania described Freeze as "skillful[ly] handling difficult situations" in the courtroom. He was commonly present at sessions of the Supreme Court. By 1905, Freeze was the oldest member of the Columbia County bar. He was also the president of the Columbia County Bar Association. Additionally, he was a member of the Pennsylvania Bar Association.

Freeze tended to avoid defending cases that hinged on a technicality.

== Political and military careers ==
Freeze held few public offices, despite having influence in the politics of Columbia County and being active in the county's affairs. Between 1863 and 1869, he served two three-year terms as the register and recorder of Columbia County. In 1872, he was chosen to be a member of the Constitutional convention to amend the Constitution of Pennsylvania. He represented the Fifteenth District, which included Columbia County, Lycoming County, Montour County, and Sullivan County. However, he resigned from this position on the third day of the convention and Charles R. Buckalew took his place.

Freeze was a lieutenant colonel on the staff of Pennsylvania governor William Bigler.

== Writing career ==
Freeze was once an editor of the Columbian. He also wrote several poetry books, with his largest work, A Royal Pastoral and other Poems, being over 300 pages in length. Other works of his include the North American Book and several pamphlets. The pamphlets were mainly on historical, literary, and theological matters. Additionally, he wrote History of Columbia County in 1876 and A History of Columbia County, Pennsylvania: From the Earliest Times in 1888. J.H. Beers described the latter book as being "undoubtedly the best written and considered the standard authority and an exhaustive work of reference on the subject".

Freeze may have written an anonymous 34-part series called "The Columbia County Invasion", which appeared in the Columbian and Democrat in 1869. However, it may have been written by Charles Brockway, the owner of the newspaper.

== Other activities ==
In 1866, Freeze and several others organized the Bloomsburg Literary Institute. He became one of the institute's trustees in its early years and held that position until his death. Freeze also eventually became a trustee of the Bloomsburg Normal School after it succeeded the Bloomsburg Literary Institute. He was also a trustee of the Bloomsburg Public Library until his death and was vice-president of the library's board of directors.

Freeze was president of the Bloomsburg Bridge Company, the Rosemont Cemetery Company, and the Bloomsburg Banking Company.

Freeze was a member of the Pennsylvania Historical Society. He was also the historian of the Bloomsburg Centennial of 1902. Additionally, he was a chancellor of the diocese of Central Pennsylvania.

Freeze was a member and also a vestryman of Saint Paul's Episcopal Church. He was a Democrat.

On February 28, 1865, Freeze sent a letter to the President of the United States, requesting that he pardon six prisoners who were held in Fort Mifflin for their supposed involvement in the Fishing Creek Confederacy. Freeze stated that "there never was any actual resistance made by them, or any of them or by anyone else in the county to the military authority of the United States".

== Personal life ==
The 1890 book Local and National Poets of America described Freeze as being 5 ft 9 in tall and weighing approximately 130 pounds (59 kg). He had gray eyes and dark hair that turned gray in his later years.

Freeze married Margaret Walker, a resident of Lancaster County, Pennsylvania, in 1854. They had five children. Freeze survived both his wife and all his children. Of his children, only the second, Maude, survived to adulthood, dying at the age of 24. Freeze's first child, Kate, died in infancy and his last three children (Hope, Helen, and Boyd) all died in childhood.

On July 8, 1913, Freeze died of old age at his home on Center and Third Streets in Bloomsburg. He was buried at the Rosemont Cemetery.
