= Fishing Creek Confederacy =

Alleged military uprising during US Civil War

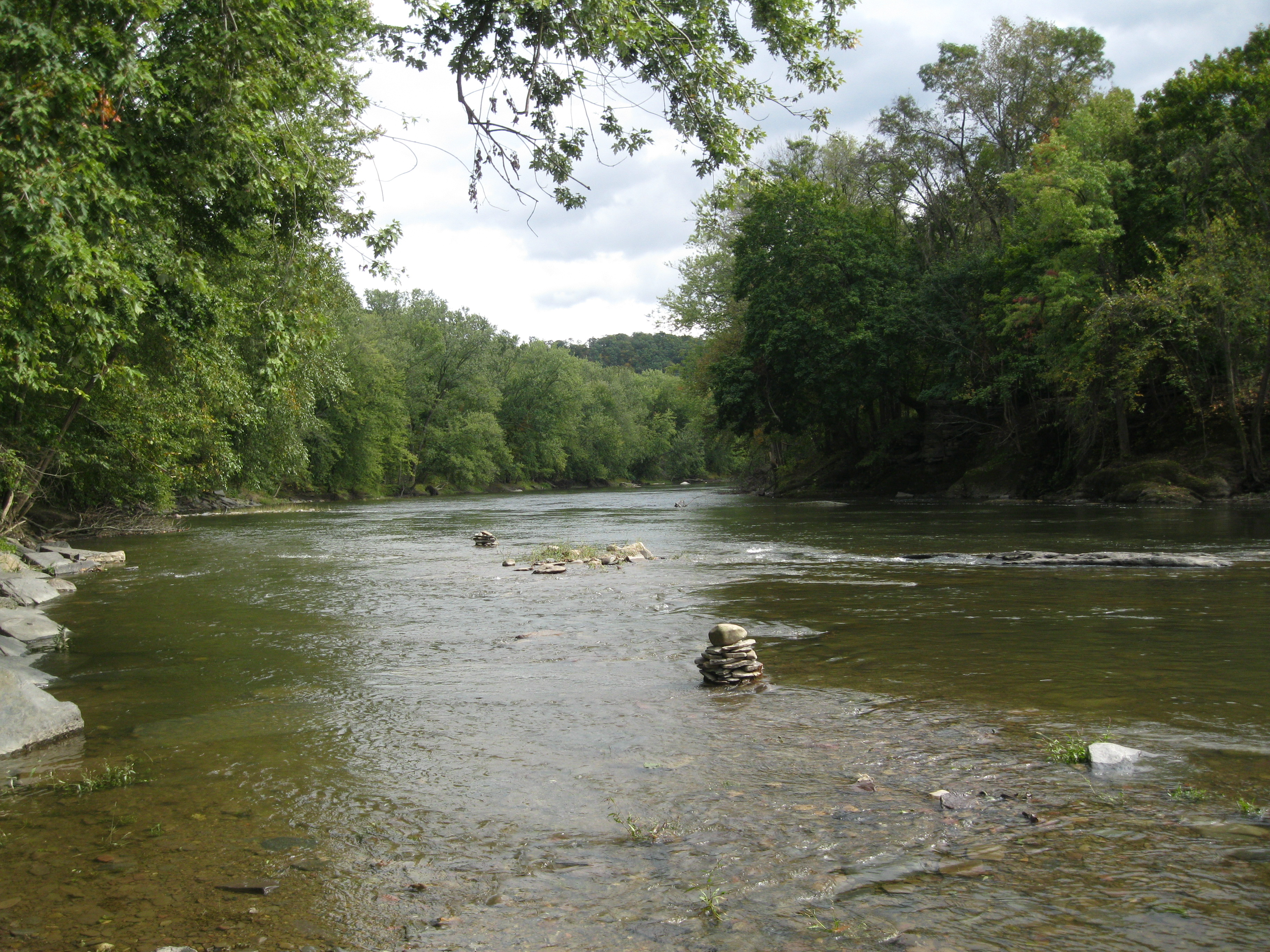
- The Fishing Creek Confederacy took place in the vicinity of Fishing Creek
Date	July to November 1864
Location	Columbia and Sullivan Counties, Pennsylvania, United States

Pennsylvania Historical Marker
- Designated: July 26, 2009

The Fishing Creek Confederacy was a military uprising in northern Columbia County, Pennsylvania and southern Sullivan County, Pennsylvania during the American Civil War. Residents of Columbia County strongly opposed military drafts that were being conducted there, leading to widespread desertion and draft evasion. In a Columbia County draft in July 1863, 618 people were drafted. Of these, approximately 75% evaded the draft. On July 30, 1864, several people rode into northern Columbia County from Luzerne County to search for deserters, and one of the riders was shot. By the summer of 1864, rumors had begun to circulate that these deserters and draft evaders, as well as Confederate sympathizers, had built a fort with cannons on North Mountain, not far from the headwaters of Fishing Creek. This fort was supposedly manned by 500 people. Upon hearing these rumors, 1000 soldiers gathered near Bloomsburg, in Columbia County.

On August 21, 1864, the soldiers began traveling up Fishing Creek. For the next week, they searched the northern portion of Columbia County for deserters and draft evaders. They were unable to find any, but on August 28 they arrested 100 local citizens. Most were released, although some were taken to Fort Mifflin. The soldiers continued heading into the northernmost reaches of the Fishing Creek watershed. Unable to find any evidence of a conspiracy, they returned to Bloomsburg and remained in the county until December 1864. The last of the prisoners were released from Fort Mifflin several months after their arrest.

The events of the Fishing Creek Confederacy were widely covered in both Democratic and Republican newspapers. In addition to contemporary coverage, the event was later reported by newspapers in the 1960s and 1970s. Professional historians began to do significant study on the confederacy in 1941, and it was mentioned in academic writings as late as 2009. Amateur historians have researched the event since the 1950s.

== Background ==
In the early 1860s, many counties in Pennsylvania were staunch supporters of the Democratic Party, while the newly elected president of the United States was the Republican Abraham Lincoln. When a large number of men were drafted from Columbia County, tensions led to raids and arrests in Columbia and neighboring counties. As early as 1862, the local press expressed outrage at a draft of 636 men, mostly mechanics and laborers. An 1863 law requiring all men from 20 to 45 years old to be drafted increased tensions further. On July 20 locals broke into the district draft office and stole the items inside. But besides this event, there was little active violence against officials of the 1863 draft.

In response to the draft law, meetings in Stillwater and Jerseytown resolved that "A war carried on contrary to the rules and provisions of [the Constitution], whether it be a crusade against slavery, or any other fanatical or delusory scheme, never can and never will receive our support." The Columbia Democrat also objected to the new draft laws. When Samuel F. Pealer, a draft officer, attempted to recruit four men in Stillwater, one of the men threatened to "knock [Pealer's] brains out". Unrest increased still further after a costly military campaign in Virginia in early 1864. By June of that year, opposition to the draft was made clear when 75 percent of all people drafted in Columbia County failed to show up. Tension was especially high in the community of Mifflinville, where many people in the county accused one another of conspiracy. The accusations became exaggerated, leading to the rumors of a fort in the mountains at the headwaters of Fishing Creek. Some people even claimed to have seen the fort and the trails along which cannons were supposedly dragged.

A Union soldier named Robinson was shot in July or August 1864 near Raven Creek, a tributary of Fishing Creek. That shooting was originally blamed on the political group known as the Knights of the Golden Circle, though it was eventually proven that the group had disbanded in 1863.

== Initial search for deserters ==
In late July 1864, Lieutenant James Stewart Robinson, Solomon Taylor, and six other Republicans from near Harveyville gathered together to search for Democratic deserters. This group, consisting mostly of veterans of the American Civil War, was deemed the "Lincoln Midnight Riders" by The Columbia Democrat. Though they initially intended to search Union County, they ended up searching Columbia County instead.

On July 30, 1864, the group set out from Fairmount Springs. Initially they sought a deserter named Silas Karns, but they were unable to find him. They next sought for a deserter named Wolf instead, supposedly hiding in the home of a man named Joseph Hess, and then for a deserter named Gomer Smith in Sugarloaf Township, but neither could be located. Finally they attempted to find a man named Thomas Smith, living in Benton Township near Raven Creek. It was in this area that four more people joined the Lincoln Midnight Riders. Thomas Smith escaped into a cornfield while his wife alerted the neighborhood about the arrival of the group. A party of locals arrived, including at least three armed deserters.

Solomon Taylor ordered the group of locals not to fire. It is unclear which group fired first, but three shots were heard, one of which hit Lieutenant Robinson. When the deserters fled the scene the Lincoln Midnight Riders chased them approximately a quarter mile before turning back. The shooting was mentioned in the Columbia Democrat which also wished Robinson a full recovery. Robinson died from peritonitis on November 3, 1864.

== Search for the fort ==
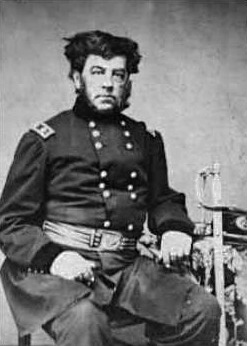
Major General George Cadwalader

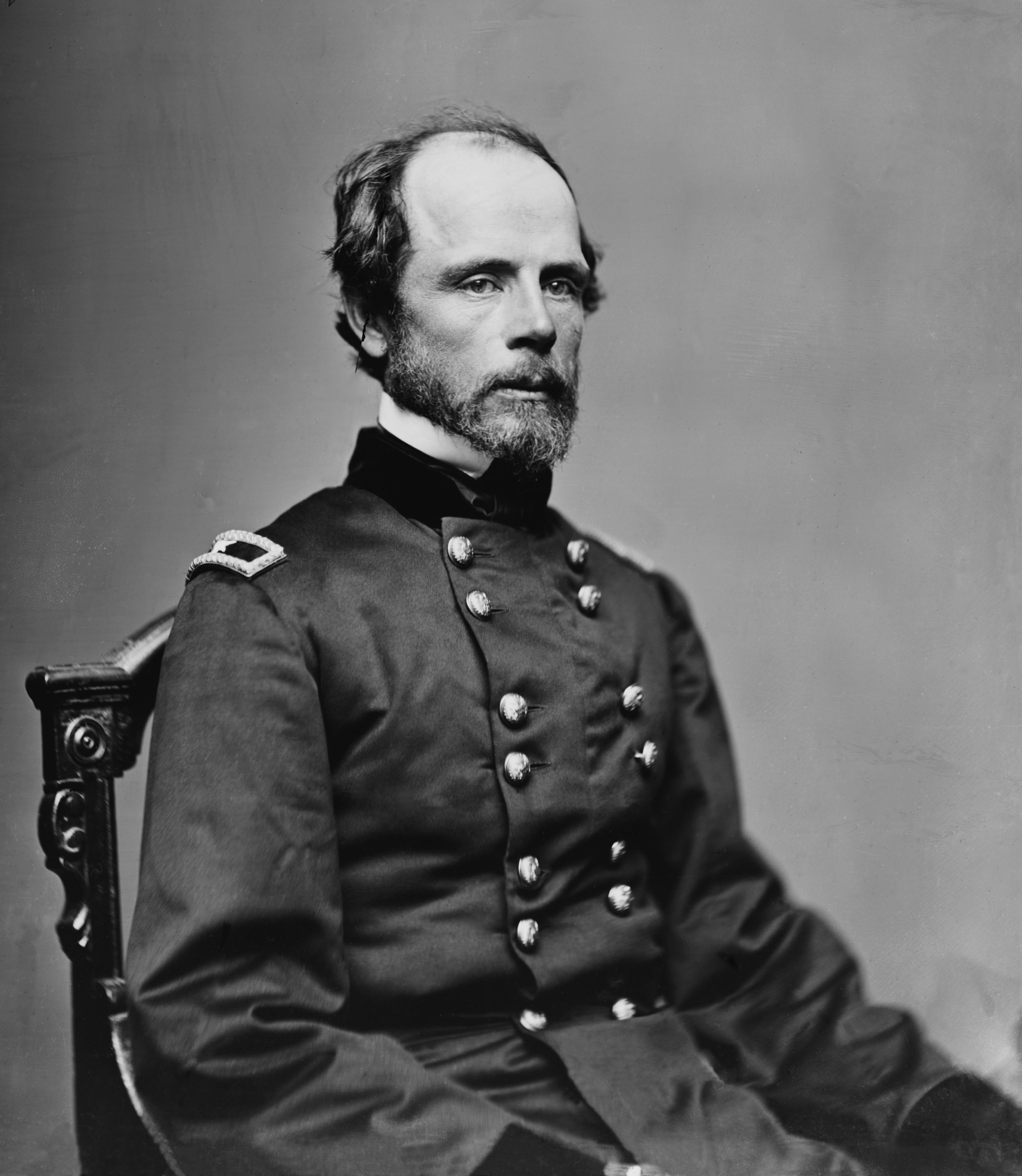
Major General Darius Couch

On August 4, 1864, after rumors of a conspiracy in Columbia County reached Harrisburg and Washington, D.C., a Captain Manville requested that 40 to 45 soldiers be sent to Columbia County to arrest the local deserters and draft evaders. Forty-eight soldiers arrived on August 13 at the Bloomsburg Fairgrounds in Bloomsburg, Pennsylvania, near the mouth of Fishing Creek. They brought two cannons and a battery of artillery. Two days later, 250 more soldiers arrived in Bloomsburg. Several prominent residents in the county, including United States Senator Charles R. Buckalew, assured the soldiers that there was no opposing armed force within the county. On August 16 Major General Darius Couch arrived to oversee the troops, and another group of soldiers arrived that same day. Colonel John Gosse Freeze delivered a message to the northern part of Columbia County, stating that any draft evaders who reported to Bloomsburg by August 20 would be pardoned. By August 21, there were a thousand soldiers in Columbia County, and they began marching up Fishing Creek to search for the alleged fort. That evening the soldiers made camp at Coleman's Grove near Benton, Pennsylvania.

While many soldiers were still arriving, the citizens of Benton held a meeting on August 14 to decide whether or not they would resist the soldiers. Many argued against it, but approximately 75 men declared they were prepared to resist any military occupation of their part of Columbia County. These men were led by Jacob Schultz, Samuel Kline, and one person from Orangeville. Kline went south to the town to learn more about the soldiers in Bloomsburg. According to an account by Edward McHenry, the other members of the resistance were told to remain at home until news arrived from Bloomsburg. When the draft evaders discovered that the army coming from Bloomsburg was too strong to defeat, McHenry and 20 other draft evaders in the county escaped to North Mountain.

Throughout the next week scouts from the army were sent through the northern townships of Columbia County. The scouts failed to find any evidence of a military uprising. They raided hen roosts, cornfields, and pigpens that they encountered. At this point Major General George Cadwalader arrived to take command of the soldiers.

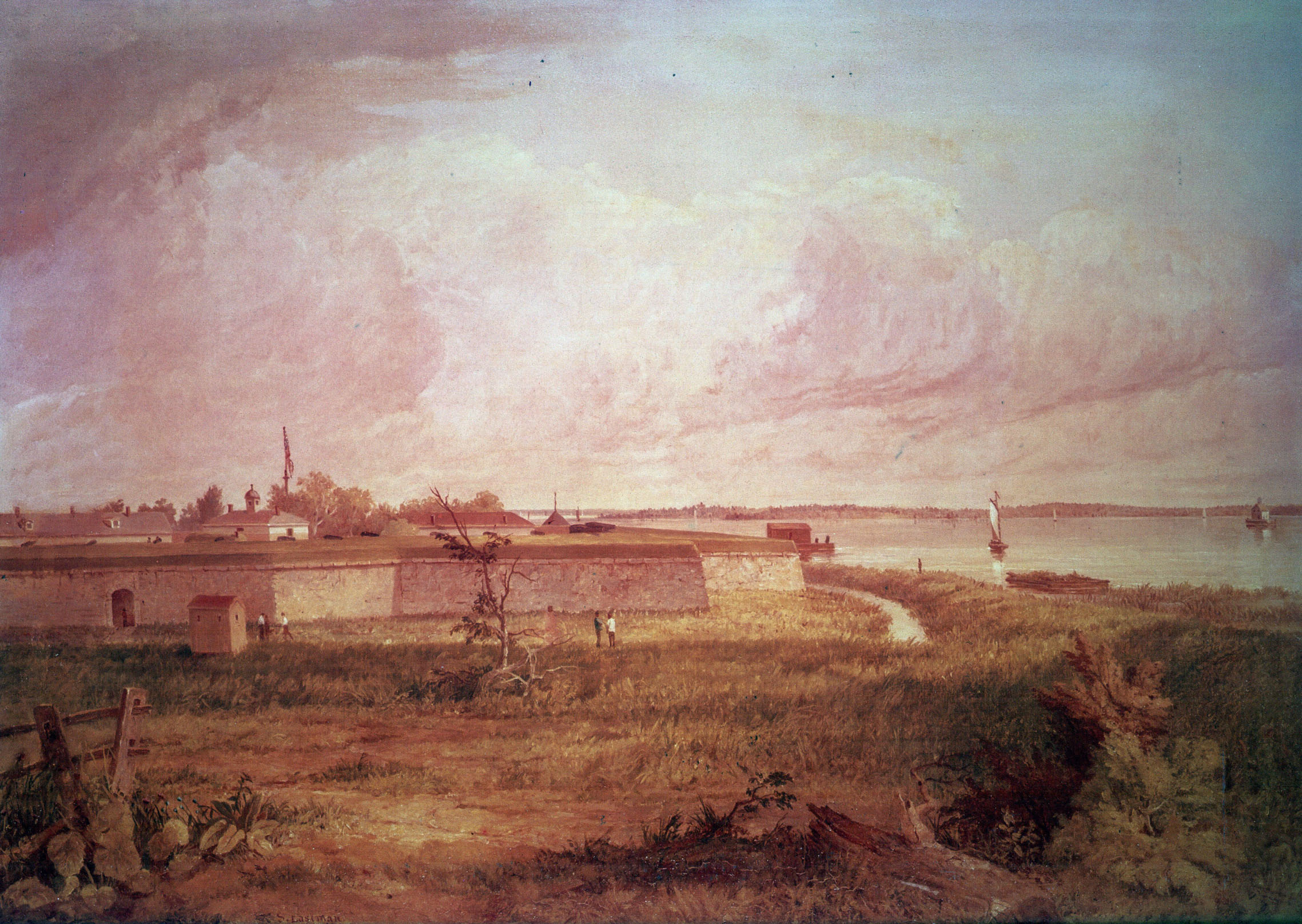
The Columbia County residents were taken to Fort Mifflin.

On August 28, 1864, soldiers surrounded 100 houses in the northern townships of Columbia County and parts of western Luzerne County, including Cambria and New Columbus. One hundred Democrats termed "Copperheads" were arrested and marched to a church in Benton. Forty-five of the prisoners were charged with disloyalty and taken to Fort Mifflin near Philadelphia. Most of these prisoners were 40 years of age or older. Only seven were convicted of the charges, and six were soon pardoned. Most people incarcerated were released within eight months.

The morning after the arrests the soldiers continued marching north, proceeding 10 miles (16 kilometers) further to the headwaters of Fishing Creek and the base of the mountains in northern Columbia County. From here they marched up the valley of East Branch Fishing Creek to its headwaters. The soldiers extensively searched the mountains of northern Columbia County for half a day, going as far north as the headwaters of East Branch Fishing Creek in southern Sullivan County, where they climbed to the top of North Mountain in three groups. At the headwaters of East Branch Fishing Creek the soldiers turned south again, then headed up West Branch Fishing Creek as far as the Sullivan County line. They found some evidence that people had been in the area, but these appeared to have been hunting or logging camps.

Eventually, unable to find any evidence of a fort in the area, the soldiers went back down Fishing Creek to Bloomsburg. Dissatisfied with their findings, the soldiers conducted a search of several unfortified homes in northern Columbia County. They captured a number of residents of Sugarloaf Township on August 31, but these were soon released.

== Aftermath ==
After returning from the mountains, the soldiers made camp in Colemans Grove and returned to Bloomsburg on September 6. That day George Cadwalader said of the alleged uprising: "The whole thing is a grand farce". Even after the attempt to find the fort was abandoned, the people held in Fort Mifflin were not released. The soldiers remained in Columbia County for several months while continuing to hunt for deserters. As late as November 2, the newspaper Star of the North reported that deserters were still being arrested, although there were fewer prisoners. On November 16 approximately 30 soldiers went as far as Dushore to arrest deserters. As they were still in Columbia County on Election Day in 1864, the soldiers guarded the polls during the local and state elections. That day between four and sixty armed soldiers were stationed at each of the polling locations within the county. According to two local newspaper editors named Tate and Jacoby, the soldiers were positioned there to stop Democrats from voting. They arrested 44 Democrats and took them to Fort Mifflin. In four townships in Columbia County (Beaver, Fishing Creek, Benton, and Sugarloaf), the voter turnout was 27% to 47% lower than the previous year, but the county still trended Democratic. Local newspaper editors Tate and Jacoby blamed the low turnout on local abolitionists.

By December 1, 1864, all soldiers had left the county to search for armed resistance in other parts of Pennsylvania. Though widespread draft evasion was evidenced in Columbia County, there was never serious armed resistance. At the end of Columbia County's occupation, the county's Democrats were deeply embittered by the arrests. It is likely that the rumor of the fort originated from sightings of large piles of shingles gathered by draft-evading shingle makers. Wooden tubs for gathering sap from sugar maples seen from a distance were likely mistaken for the fort's cannons. A deserters' hideout on North Mountain, a cabin 20 feet (6.1 meters) square and two stories high, may have been the subject of exaggerated claims by Republicans that the cabin was a fort. A structure that may have once been this cabin was rediscovered on July 13, 2007. In December 1864, the soldiers who left Columbia County went on to Clearfield County to continue their search for deserters and draft evaders.

The trials for the Columbia County residents held at Fort Mifflin were held in October and November 1864. At least three of those tried admitted to having been at a secret meeting on August 14, that many people were armed at the meeting, and that the people at the meeting intended to resist the soldiers in Bloomsburg. However, most of the prisoners were released on or before January 1865, although a few were held until May 1865. No one was charged for the murder of Lieutenant Robinson until 1891, when Elias Young was arrested and charged. Although Young admitted to firing a gun, he stated that two people in the party searching for deserters had fired first. The court ruled that Young was acting in self-defense, and he was declared not guilty.

== Media response ==
=== Contemporary coverage ===
The term "Fishing Creek Confederacy" was first used by an editor in Muncy on August 23, 1864. This editor, as well as J.R. Cornelius of the Union County Star and Lewisburg Chronicle both blamed the events of the Fishing Creek Confederacy on biased stories in Democrat newspapers. Forney's War Press of Philadelphia blamed the events on the Columbia County leaders, stating that the leaders led the people of Columbia County into treason. However, Democratic newspapers instead held the abolitionists responsible for the events of the Fishing Creek Confederacy. For instance, Truman Purdy, editor of the Northumberland County Democrat stated that Bloomsburg's abolitionists sent for military forces to arrest unarmed farmers due to having believed exaggerated stories of the shooting on July 30. However the Sunbury Gazette stated that the farmers were actually armed and prepared to resist the law. The conflict between the opposing newspapers reached its most severe level in May 1865. At one point Republican newspapers such as the Harrisburg Telegraph ran stories that connected Charles R. Buckalew with the events of the Fishing Creek Confederacy.

=== Later media response ===
In the 1950s, amateur historians first began writing accounts of the events of the Fishing Creek Confederacy. In January 1950, William M. Scnure mentioned the event at a meeting of the Northumberland County Historical Society, and the fort on North Mountain was said to exist in an article written by Myrtle Magargel in 1955. In 1958 the Fishing Creek Confederacy was mentioned in the History of Columbia County, Pennsylvania, which was intended to be used in schools in Columbia County. In the 1960s and 1970s local newspapers occasionally ran articles summarizing the Fishing Creek Confederacy. In 1998, the Bloomsburg Theater Ensemble compiled a book of Columbia County history based on letters to the editor, and several of these letters mentioned the Fishing Creek Confederacy. In 2012 Byron Heller wrote a piece of historical fiction called The Fishing Creek Confederacy, inspired by the events of the Fishing Creek Confederacy. The confederacy has been the subject of satirical works.

The Fishing Creek Confederacy has also been the subject of a number of academic writings. In 1941 William Itter devoted a paragraph to the event in his doctoral dissertation, and in 1956 the historian William W. Hummel wrote an article on the Fishing Creek Confederacy. In 2009 the book Deserter Country: Civil War Opposition in the Pennsylvania Appalachians was written by Robert M. Sandlow as an extension of his doctoral dissertation.

== See also ==
- New York City draft riots
