= Elk Grove, Pennsylvania =

- Unincorporated community Census designated place
- Location of Sullivan County in Pennsylvania

- Location within Pennsylvania Location within the United States
- Coordinates: 41°18′21.6″N 76°24′26.8″W
- Country: United States
- State: Pennsylvania
- County: Sullivan and Columbia
- Township: Davidson and Sugarloaf
- Elevation: 1,194 ft (364 m)
- 37
- Time zone: UTC-5 (Eastern (EST))
  - Summer (DST): UTC-4 (EDT)
- GNIS feature ID: 2830782

Elk Grove, Pennsylvania is an unincorporated community and census designated place (CDP) in Davidson Township, Sullivan County and Sugarloaf Township, Columbia County, in the U.S. state of Pennsylvania.

== Demographics ==
Historical population
Census	Pop.	Note	%±
2023 (est.)	37

The United States Census Bureau defined Elk Grove as a census designated place in 2023.
