= North Mountain (Pennsylvania) =

Mountain in Pennsylvania, United States

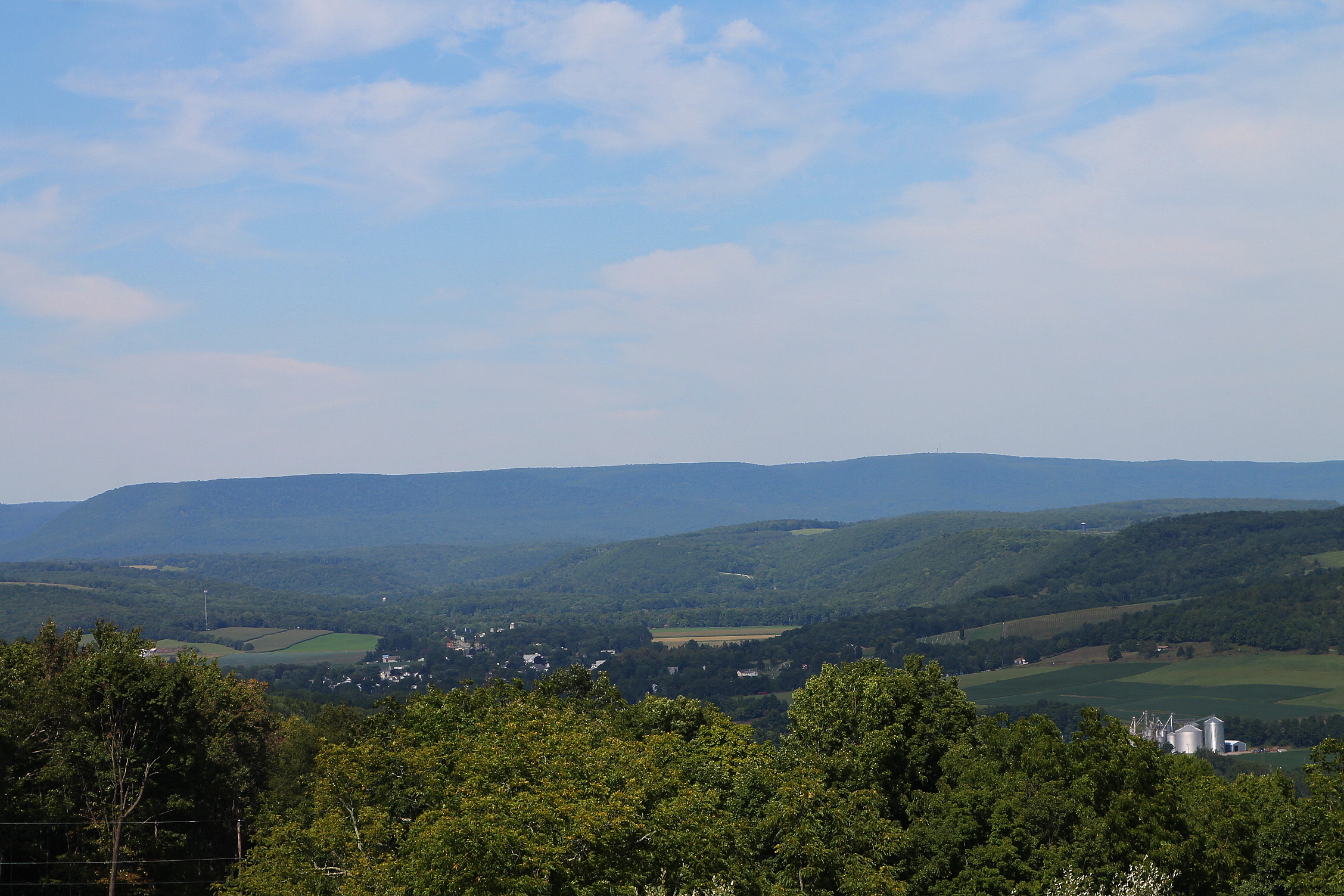
- North Mountain (background) and northern Columbia County (foreground)

Highest point
- Elevation: 2,584 ft (788 m)
- Coordinates: 41°19′10″N 76°33′14″W

Geography
- Location within Pennsylvania
- Location: Davidson Township, Sullivan County, Pennsylvania, U.S.A.
- Parent range: Allegheny Mountains

Climbing
- Easiest route: Road to fire tower

North Mountain is a 2,584-foot (788 m) ridge primarily located in Davidson Township of Sullivan County in the U.S. state of Pennsylvania. Its summit is that county's highest point, the 10th highest among the state's 67 counties. Portions also extend into neighboring Lycoming, Luzerne, and Wyoming counties.

The mountain has a topographic isolation of 57.99 miles (93.33 km). U.S. Route 220 passes near the mountain. The mountain once had a prolific population of animals, including grouse, deer (including white deer), and bears.

Historic industries on and around North Mountain include lumbering and ice cutting. Pennsylvania Route 487 goes over North Mountain. The mountain is home to the North Mountain Fire Tower.

== Geography and geology ==
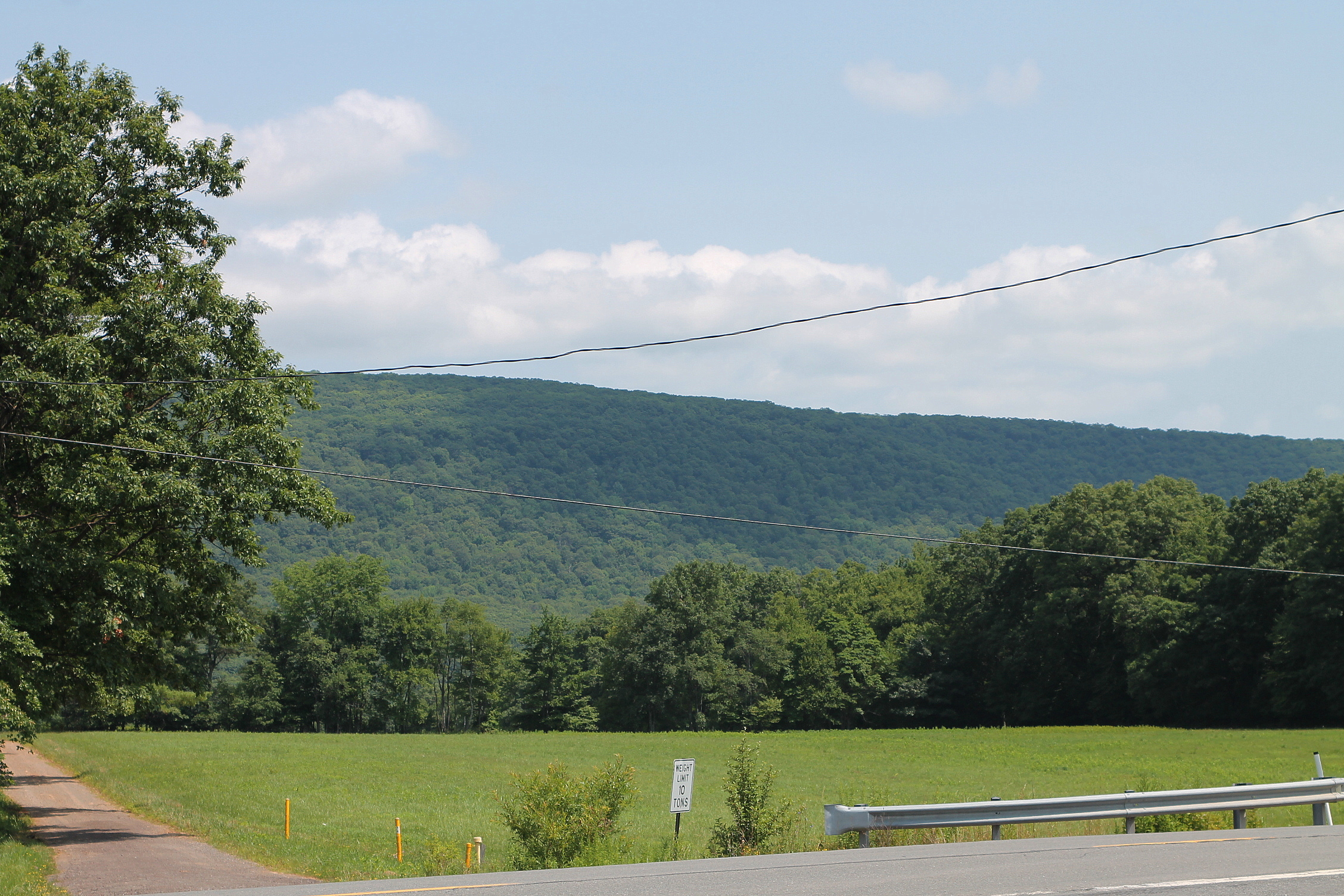
North Mountain as seen from Jordan Township, Pennsylvania

North Mountain extends over portions of three counties. Its highest point is in Sullivan County. The mountain is part of the Endless Mountains, though it is slightly removed from their main body. It is also on the eastern edge of the Allegheny Mountains. A 1920 book called the mountain the "monarch of hills". The same book also stated that it resembled Notre-Dame de Paris. The Loyalsock Valley is close to North Mountain.

The mountain has an area of approximately 250 square miles. Its average elevation is approximately 2,000 feet (610 m). An extension of North Mountain in Davidson Township contains a plateau that is situated on the south side of Lopez Creek. An area consisting of approximately one third of North Mountain is known as Dutch Mountain.

The bedrock under the summit of North Mountain belongs to the Pocono Formation. When the first settlers arrived in Davison Township, Sullivan County, they encountered a fertile plain at the mountain's base. A small coal bed is located on a cliff on the mountain, near Ganoga Lake. It is less than 6 inches (15 cm) thick in places.

The North Mountain plateau has anticlinal and synclinal axes that run north 75° east to south 75° west. There is also a nearby geological structure known as the Ganoga Basin, which runs between Spring Creek and North Mountain. The basin's rock gently slopes northwards and southwards. At one point, the mountain rises 1,200 feet (370 m) above the surrounding area. At that point, the horizontal distance is from the surrounding area to the peak is 2,640 feet (800 m), giving the mountain a slope of approximately 0.46.

== Hydrology ==
North Mountain is situated in the watershed of the Susquehanna River. Sub-watersheds that waters from the mountain drain into include West Branch Susquehanna River. Fishing Creek and its tributaries have their headwaters on the mountain, as does Muncy Creek. The tributaries of Fishing Creek in North Mountain have gorges.

== History ==
The area around North Mountain was originally controlled by the Senecas. However, the last Indian village in the vicinity of North Mountain was destroyed in 1784 by a group of rangers led by Nigel Gray, Colonel of the Rangers. They also captured and wounded Skanando, a scalp hunter in the region. A trail blazed to facilitate communication between the frontier of upper Fishing Creek and North Mountain and forts on the Susquehanna River once lead from the community of Buckhorn to North Mountain. A tract of land purchased by William Hess by 1792 included parts of the mountain. However, the first person to settle in the Sullivan County portion of North Mountain was Griffith Phillips, who settled there in 1812.

The Northumberland Road was built by settlers living near North Mountain in 1806 and 1808. It most likely ran from North Mountain into Columbia County, which was part of Northumberland County at the time. However, it may have run as far north as Shrewsbury Township.

North Mountain was surveyed by Jonathan Hastie.

During the events of the Fishing Creek Confederacy, there were rumors that a fort with cannons had been built on North Mountain by deserters and draft evaders during the American Civil War. Approximately 1,000 Union Army soldiers searched for the fort on the mountain in late August 1864, but were unable to locate it.

In 2007, however, a 20 feet (6.1 m) cabin used by hiding draft evaders during the American Civil War was discovered on North Mountain. However, at the time of the Fishing Creek Confederacy, locals in Benton Township, Fishing Creek Township and neighboring communities discuseds the idea that a fort on the mountain would likely enable an army of 100 men to defeat an army of 1000 men.

=== Industries ===
Between 1890 and 1910, North Mountain was the location of the last major lumbering industry in its region. Several communities in the vicinity of the mountain had this as their main industry. From 1887 to 1912, the community of Alderston was a lumbering town; as was Harvey's Lake and Stull, from 1891 to 1906. Lopez was a lumbering town from 1887 to 1905, Jamison City was a lumbering town from 1889 to 1912, and Ricketts was a lumbering town from 1890 to 1912. The Lehigh Valley Railroad purchased 13,000 acres of forest on the mountain in 1876.

Ice cutting was another industry that was practiced in the vicinity of North Mountain. The community of Mountain Springs was where the industry was mostly practiced on the mountain. It was done here from 1891 to 1948. It was also practiced near Lake Ganoga between 1896 and 1915.

Arthur Lewis Stull was a major figure in the lumbering and ice cutting industries on the mountain. In the late 1880s, R. Bruce Ricketts owned portions of mountain's forests.

There were no railroads through North Mountain or its immediately surroundings until 1893, when a rail line between Wilkes-Barre and Towanda opened, allowing passengers to surpass the mountain on train routes. The concept of constructing a railroad around the mountain had been considered previously by Lehigh Valley Railroad, Pennsylvania Railroad, and possibly the Delaware, Lackawanna, and Western Railroad, although none of these companies move from a conceptual to development stage on the idea. Wilkes-Barre and Harvey’s Lake Railroad was later created as a second link between R. Bruce Ricketts' land on the mountain and Wilkes-Barre. Later, a number of spur lines were created in North Mountain's forests.

=== Recreation ===
In the 1880s, residents of Philadelphia and other cities began relocating to the North Mountain area to hunt game, including grouse and bears, although overhunting reduced the amount of game in the area. At that time, the mountain was the most prolific spot for game in Pennsylvania, with the exception of Seven Mountains in Centre County and Mifflin County.

In 1893, R. Bruce Ricketts finished constructing a retreat on North Mountain. Work on the retreat was initiated in 1889. In 1879, the North Mountain Fishing Club was founded, and it continued until 1903. It was reestablished in 1907. R. Bruce Ricketts lived at one point in a stone mansion known as the Ganoga House, which was situated in the vicinity of the mountain. When Ricketts lived in it, it was the highest inhabited point in Pennsylvania.

There are no major ski resorts on North Mountain. Much of the land on the mountain is part of the Pennsylvania State Game Lands, particularly State Game Lands Number 13. However, between 1964 and 1984, a ski slope did exist on North Mountain near Sonestown. The slope featured a J-bar lift. A Poma lift was also brought to the slope, but never installed. There were plans at one point to extend the ski slope to a height 1400 vertical feet, but these plans ran afoul of local zoning laws. As of 2008, the slope was well-maintained.

=== Fauna and flora ===
A 1930 report noted that North Mountain was home to pine mice, Hoy's shrews, southern flying squirrels, and three species of bats. The report also stated that pikas, also known as rock rabbits, from the Rocky Mountains adapted well on North Mountain. wolves were common in the North Mountain region in 1861 at the beginning of the American Civil War. But four years later, as the war was ending in 1865, they were extremely rare in that region. These wolves were typically large gray wolves, with adult males weighing close to 100 pounds (45 kg).

North Mountain was one of the few places in Pennsylvania where pine martens lived in the early 20th century. North Mountain and its immediate surroundings was one of the last areas where northern white-tailed deer survived in significant numbers. As of 1920, more white deer had been killed in the North Mountain vicinity than any other location in Pennsylvania. In the early 1800s, the mountain was said to be home to every mammal and bird species in Pennsylvania. The bird population of the mountain was studied as early as 1891.

As of 1920, there also was a high concentration of beech mast in the area of North Mountain. Pine and hemlock have also been observed on the mountain. There were mature and primeval forests. But after the lumbering industry, these primeval forests were largely replaced by northern hardwood trees, including sugar maple, red maple, American beech, and black cherry.

== See also ==
- Central Mountain
- Knob Mountain (Pennsylvania)
