= Davidson Township, Sullivan County, Pennsylvania =

Township in Pennsylvania, US

Davidson Township, Pennsylvania
- Township
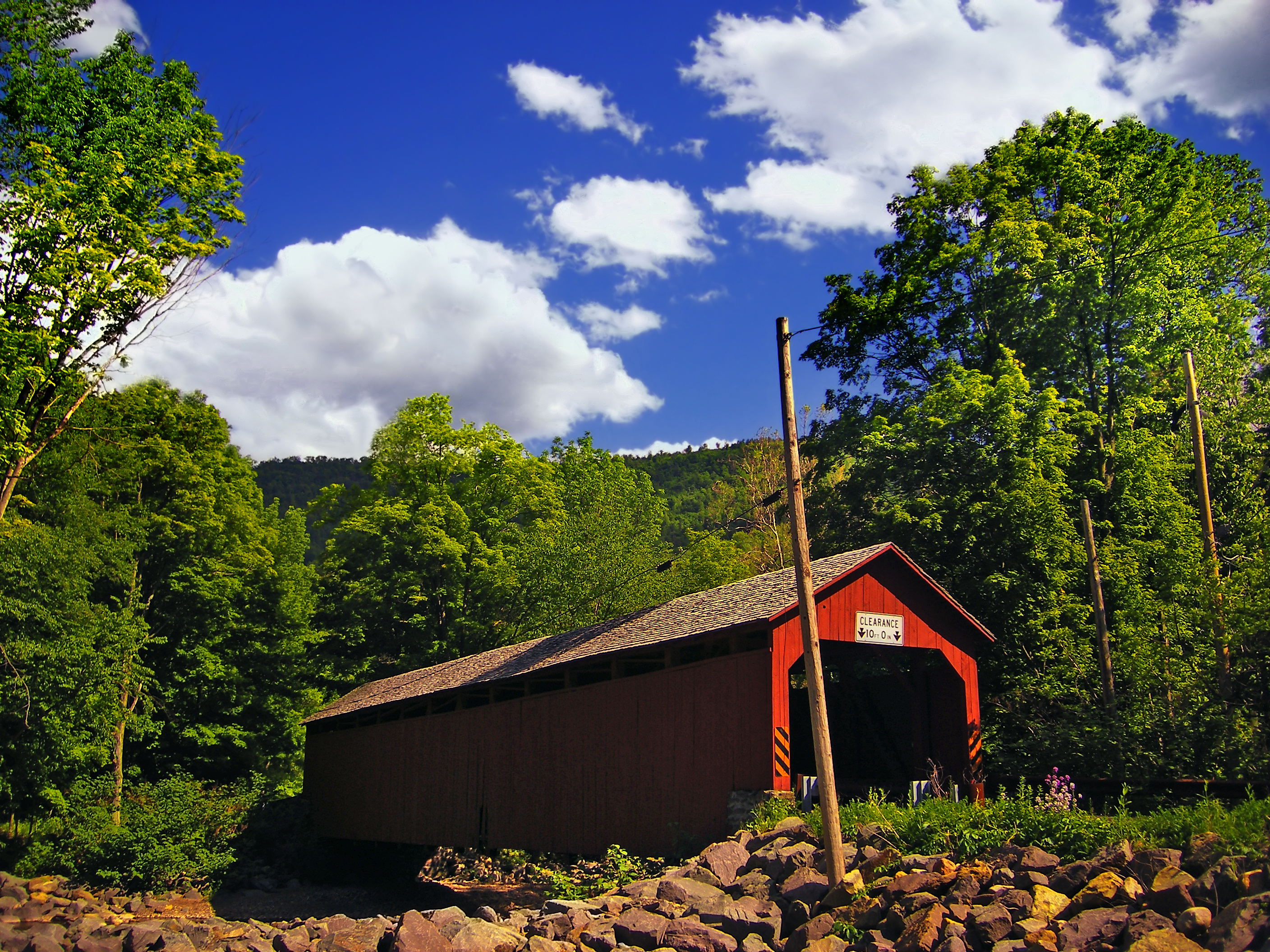
- Sonestown Covered Bridge in Davidson Township

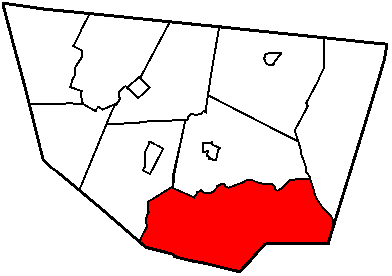
- Map of Sullivan County, Pennsylvania highlighting Davidson Township

- Map of Pennsylvania highlighting Sullivan County
- Coordinates: 41°20′00″N 76°26′59″W
- Country: United States
- State: Pennsylvania
- County: Sullivan
- Settled: 1806
- Incorporated: 1833

Area
  - Total: 77.92 sq mi (201.82 km^{2})
  - Land: 77.86 sq mi (201.66 km^{2})
  - Water: 0.058 sq mi (0.15 km^{2})
- Elevation: 2,385 ft (727 m)

Population (2020)
  - Total: 544 ▼
  - Estimate (2021): 547
  - Density: 6.9/sq mi (2.67/km^{2})
- Time zone: Eastern (EST)
  - Summer (DST): EDT
- FIPS code: 42-113-18296

Davidson Township is a township in Sullivan County, Pennsylvania, United States. The population was 544 at the 2020 census.

== History ==
The Sonestown Covered Bridge was added to the National Register of Historic Places in 1980.

== Geography ==
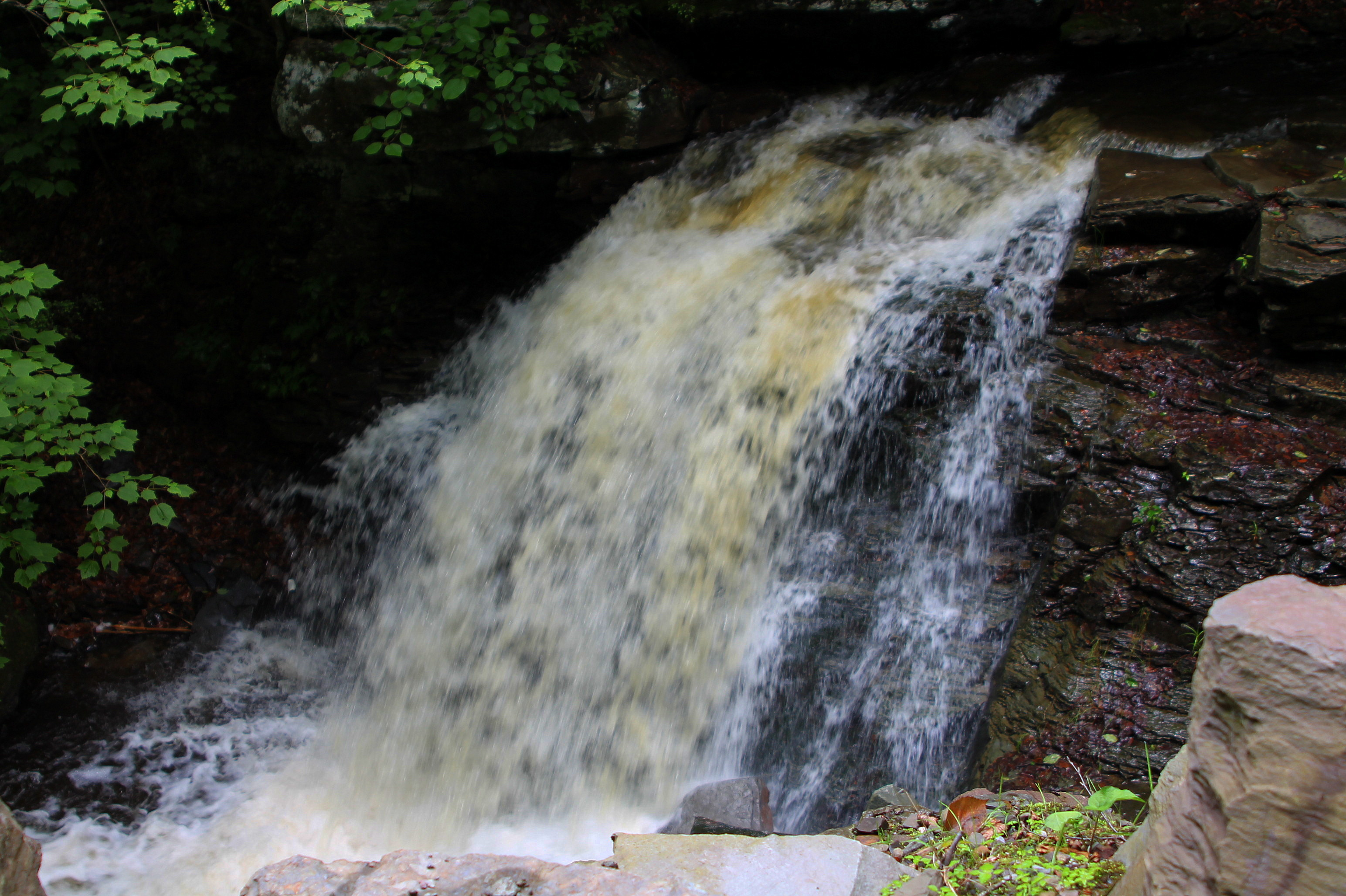
Big Run falls in Davidson Township

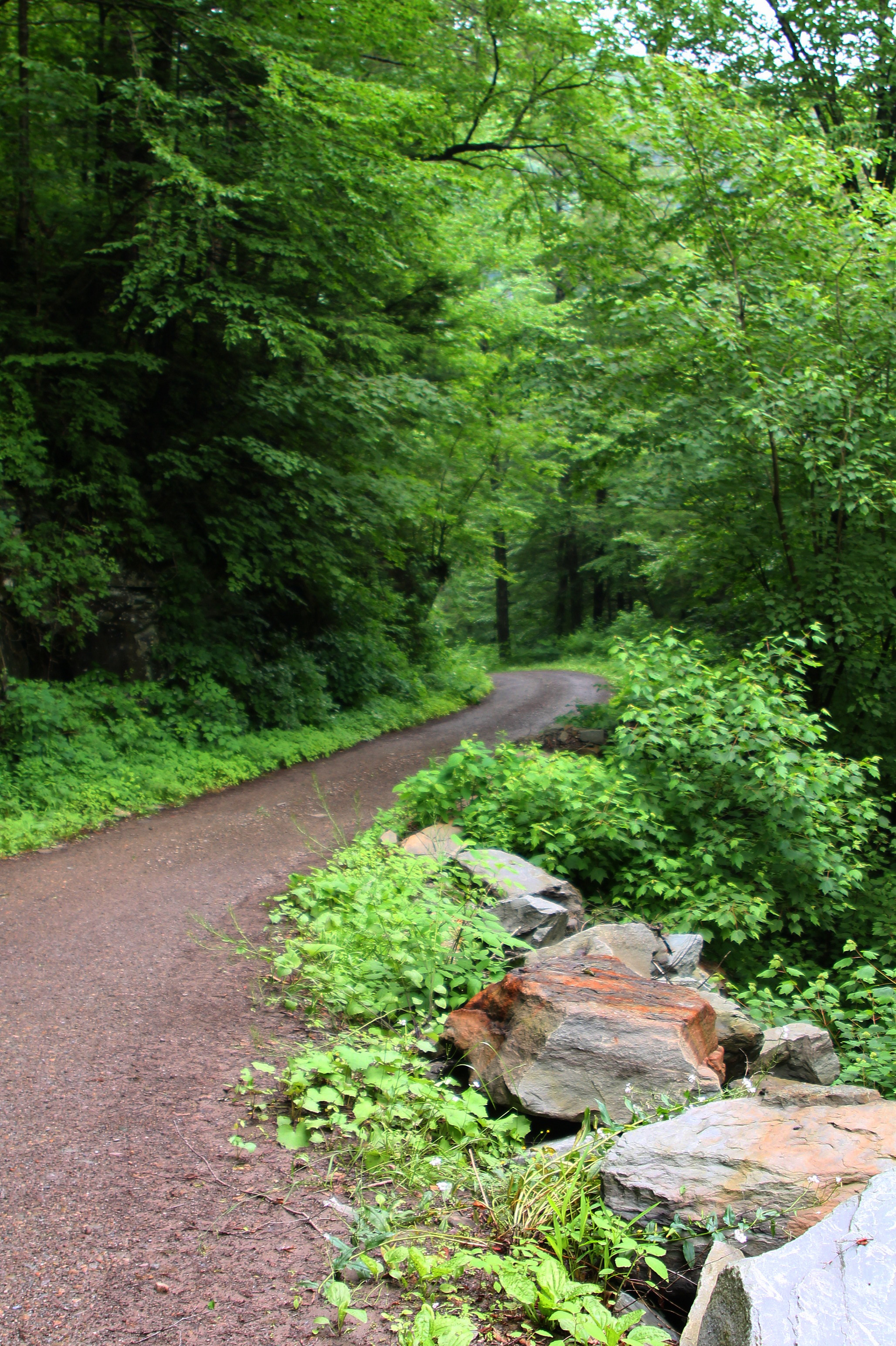
Jamison City Road in Davidson Township

According to the United States Census Bureau, the township has a total area of 78.2 square miles (203 km^{2}), of which 78.1 square miles (202 km^{2}) is land and 0.1 square miles (0.26 km^{2}) (0.08%) is water.

Davidson Township is bordered by Laporte Township to the north, Colley Township and Luzerne County to the east and Columbia and Lycoming Counties to the south and Shrewsbury Township to the west.

== Demographics ==
Historical population
Census	Pop.	Note	%±
2010	573		—
2020	544		−5.1%
2021 (est.)	547		0.6%
U.S. Decennial Census

As of the census of 2000, there were 626 people, 269 households, and 189 families residing in the township. The population density was 8.0 people per square mile (3.1/km^{2}). There were 602 housing units at an average density of 7.7/sq mi (3.0/km^{2}). The racial makeup of the township was 98.40% White, 0.16% African American, 0.32% Native American, 0.16% from other races, and 0.96% from two or more races. Hispanic or Latino of any race were 0.48% of the population.

There were 269 households, out of which 25.3% had children under the age of 18 living with them, 59.1% were married couples living together, 8.2% had a female householder with no husband present, and 29.4% were non-families. 26.8% of all households were made up of individuals, and 13.8% had someone living alone who was 65 years of age or older. The average household size was 2.33 and the average family size was 2.76.

In the township the population was spread out, with 18.4% under the age of 18, 8.1% from 18 to 24, 26.2% from 25 to 44, 27.8% from 45 to 64, and 19.5% who were 65 years of age or older. The median age was 43 years. For every 100 females, there were 102.6 males. For every 100 females age 18 and over, there were 98.8 males.

The median income for a household in the township was $32,857, and the median income for a family was $36,875. Males had a median income of $24,875 versus $22,054 for females. The per capita income for the township was $14,483. About 3.0% of families and 7.3% of the population were below the poverty line, including 4.2% of those under age 18 and 2.4% of those age 65 or over.

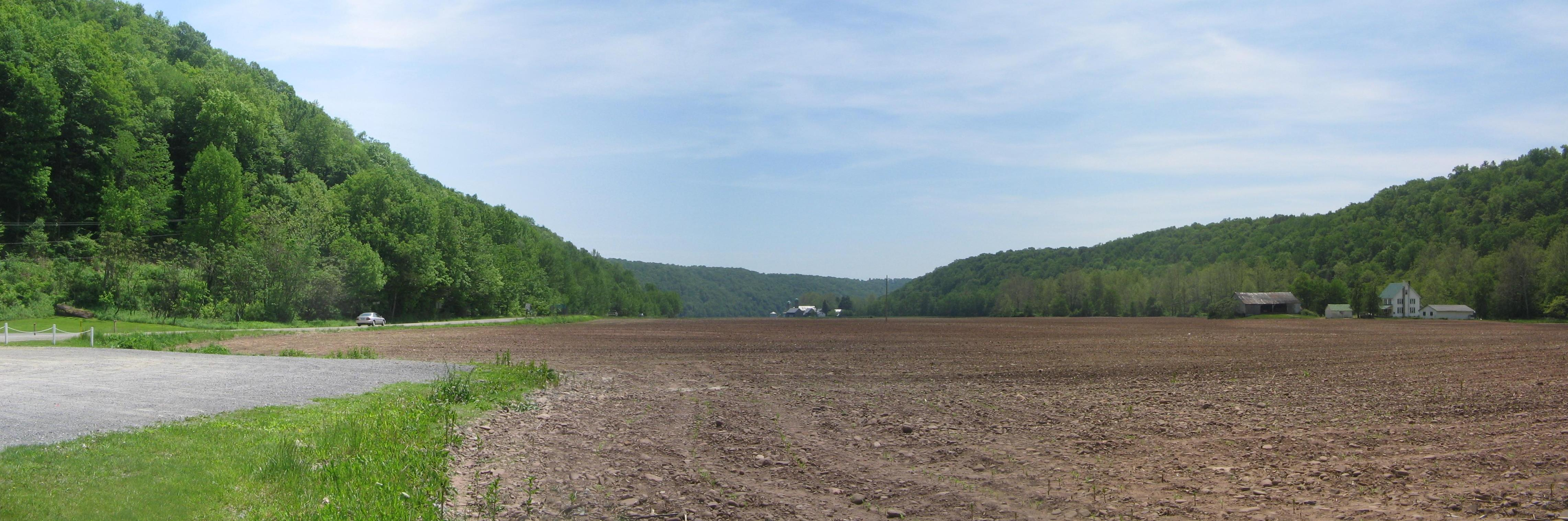
Muncy Creek Valley in Davidson Township

== Notable person ==
American Idol season 9 Star, Aaron Kelly
