= Shingle Run (Huntington Creek tributary) =

Physical characteristics
- Source
  - location: valley just south of Pennsylvania Route 118 in Ross Township, Luzerne County, Pennsylvania
  - elevation: 1,340 ft (410 m)
- Mouth
  - location: Huntington Creek in Ross Township, Luzerne County, Pennsylvania
  - coordinates: 41°17′12″N 76°10′54″W
  - elevation: 977 ft (298 m)
- Length: 1.83 mi (2.95 km)
- Basin size: 1.83 mi^{2} (4.7 km^{2})

Basin features
- Progression: Huntington Creek → Fishing Creek → Susquehanna River → Chesapeake Bay

Shingle Run is a tributary of Huntington Creek in Luzerne County, Pennsylvania, in the United States. It is approximately 1.8 miles (2.9 km) long and flows through Ross Township. The watershed of the stream has an area of 1.83 square miles (4.7 km^{2}) and it has no tributaries. The stream is considered to be Class A Wild Trout Waters for its entire length. Additionally, it is listed in the Luzerne County Natural Areas Inventory. Various species of butterfly inhabit the stream's vicinity. Trees in the area include hemlocks and yellow birches. The stream is small, but nevertheless is perennial.

== Course ==
Shingle Run begins in a valley just south of Pennsylvania Route 118 in Ross Township. It flows south-southeast for several tenths of a mile. The stream then turns nearly due south for more than a mile. Its valley becomes progressively deeper. At the southern edge of its valley, the stream reaches its confluence with Huntington Creek.

Shingle Run joins Huntington Creek 22.18 miles (35.70 km) upstream of its mouth.

=== Tributaries ===
Shingle Run has no tributaries, named or unnamed.

== Hydrology and geography ==
The concentration of alkalinity in Shingle Run is 12 milligrams per liter. The stream is a small feeder tributary of Huntington Creek. However, it has a perennial flow.

The elevation near the mouth of Shingle Run is 977 feet (298 m) above sea level. The elevation of the stream's source is approximately 1,340 feet (410 m) above sea level. The stream is 2.8 miles (4.5 km) west of a lake known as Sylvan Lake.

== Watershed ==
The watershed of Shingle Run has an area of 1.83 square miles (4.7 km^{2}). The stream's watershed is part of the Lower North Branch Susquehanna River drainage basin.

Shingle Run is entirely within the United States Geological Survey quadrangle of Sweet Valley. A total of 92 percent of the stream's length is on open and public lands. The remaining 8 percent of its length is on private lands that are open to the public. Much of the stream is owned by the Pennsylvania Game Commission and is in Pennsylvania State Game Lands Number 206.

== History ==
Shingle Run was entered into the Geographic Names Information System on August 2, 1979. Its identifier in the Geographic Names Information System is 1187540. Shingle Run has had its name since at least 1958, when it was on a map created by the Pennsylvania Fish Commission.

Shingle Run is listed on the Luzerne County Natural Areas Inventory, having been added to it in 2006. Its priority rank is 4 on a scale of 1 to 5, with 1 being the most important.

== Biology ==
Shingle Run is considered by the Pennsylvania Fish and Boat Commission to be Class A Wild Trout Waters from its headwaters to its mouth. The stream is one of six direct tributaries of Huntington Creek to be designated as Class A Wild Trout Waters. The others are Mitchler Run, Arnold Creek, Lick Branch, Phillips Creek, and part of Kitchen Creek. It is inhabited by brook trout.

A number of butterfly species inhabit the vicinity of Shingle Run. These include the Aphrodite fritillary, the Atlantis fritillary, and the northern pearly-eye. Thick forests of pole-sized trees such as hemlock and yellow birch occur along the stream.

== See also ==
- Arnold Creek (Huntington Creek), next tributary of Huntington Creek going downstream
- Laurel Run (Huntington Creek), next tributary of Huntington Creek going upstream
- List of tributaries of Fishing Creek (North Branch Susquehanna River)
- List of rivers of Pennsylvania
