= Mitchler Run =

Coordinates: 41.2971°N 76.1658°W

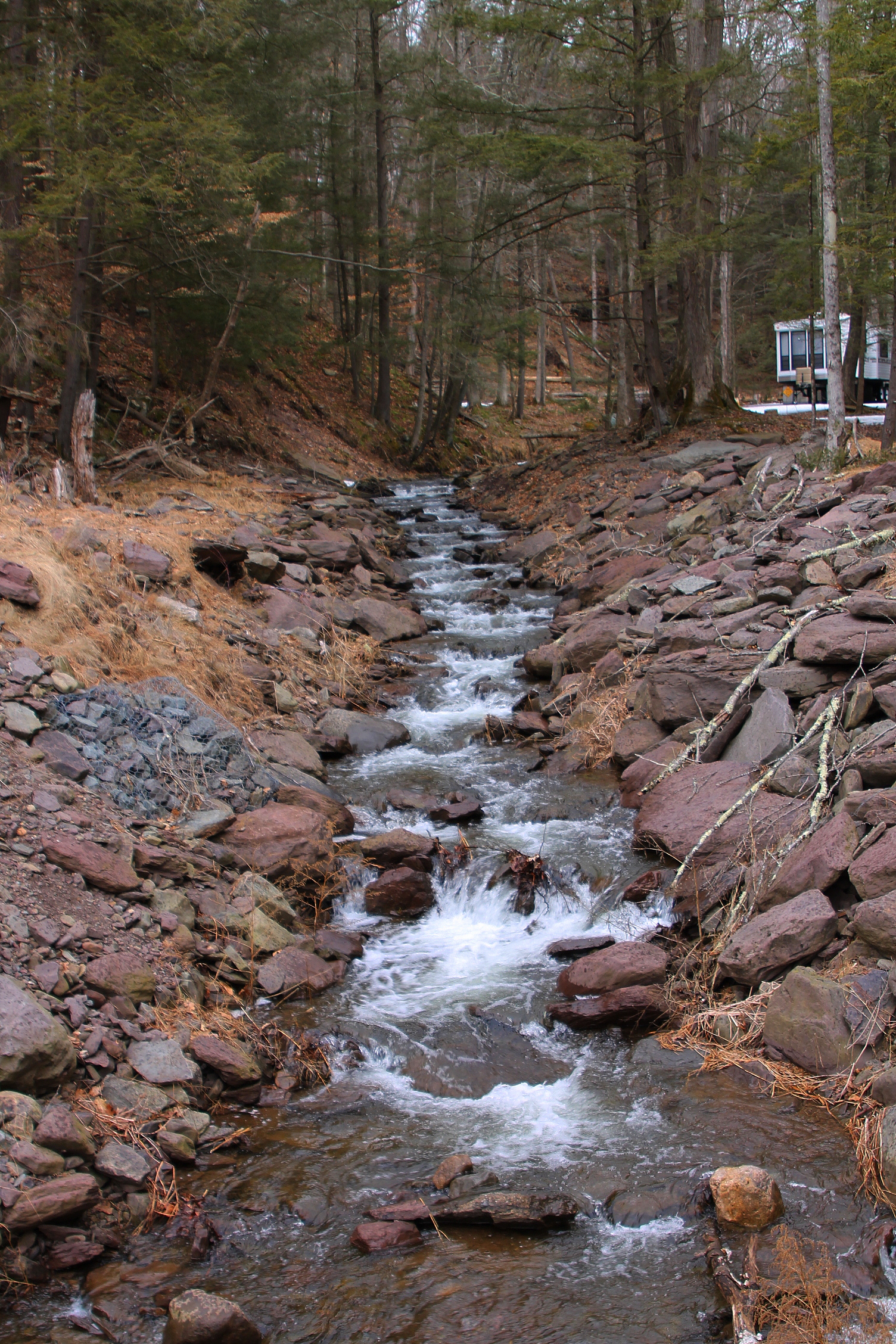
- Mitchler Run looking upstream

Physical characteristics
- Source
  - location: near the base of a mountain in Ross Township, Luzerne County, Pennsylvania
  - elevation: between 1,400 and 1,420 feet (430 and 430 m)
- Mouth
  - location: Huntington Creek in Ross Township, Luzerne County, Pennsylvania
  - elevation: 1,089 ft (332 m)
- Length: 1.9 mi (3.1 km)
- Basin size: 1.52 sq mi (3.9 km^{2})

Basin features
- Progression: Huntington Creek → Fishing Creek → Susquehanna River → Chesapeake Bay

Mitchler Run is a tributary of Huntington Creek in Luzerne County, Pennsylvania, in the United States. It is approximately 1.9 miles (3.1 km) long and flows through Ross Township. The watershed of the stream has an area of 1.52 square miles (3.9 km^{2}) and the stream has no named tributaries. The stream is considered by the Pennsylvania Fish and Boat Commission to be Class A Wild Trout Waters for brook trout.

== Course ==
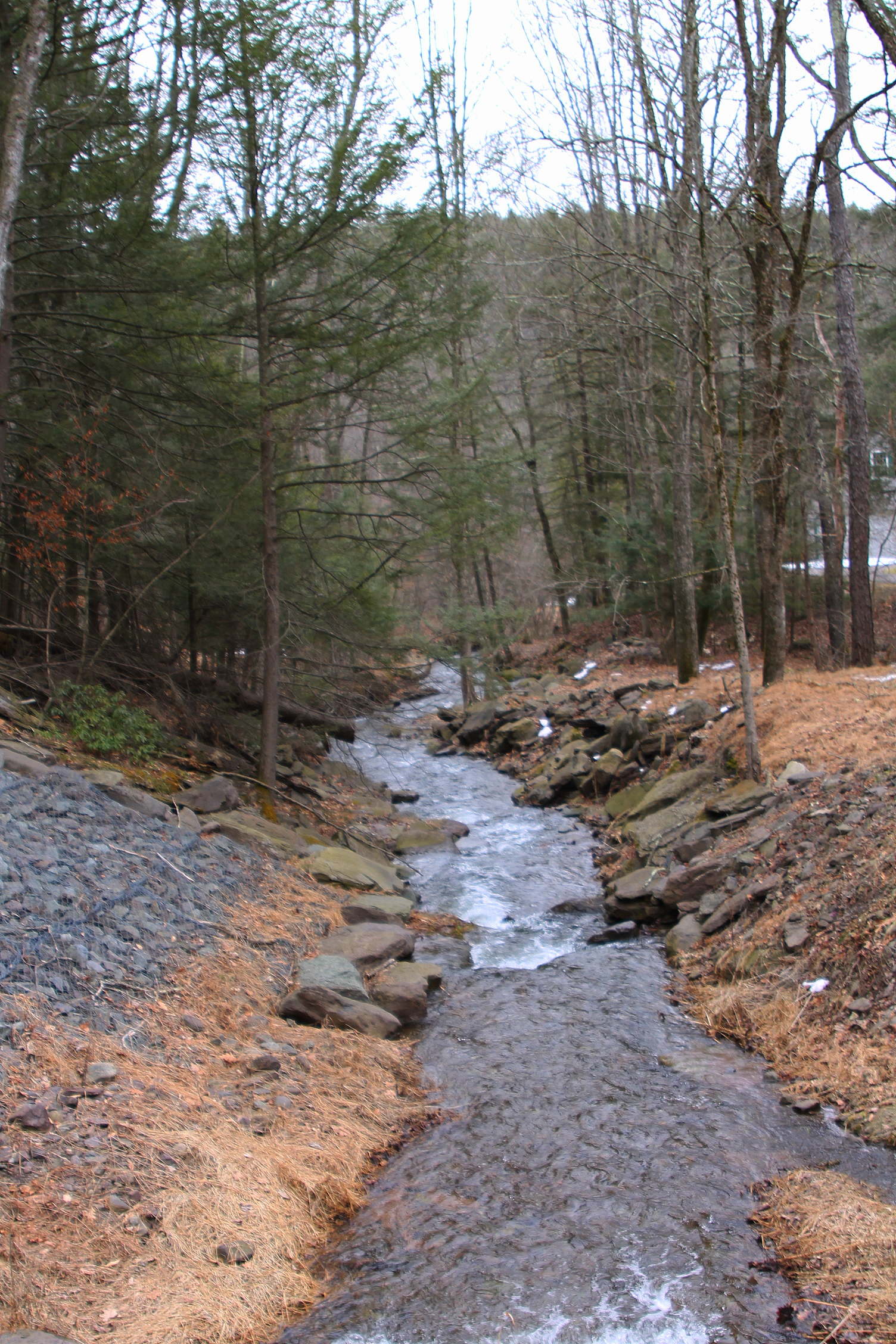
Mitchler Run looking downstream

Mitchler Run begins near the base of a mountain in Ross Township. It flows east for several hundred feet before turning south-southwest and entering a valley. After several tenths of a mile, the stream crosses Pennsylvania Route 118 and continues flowing south-southwest. Some distance further downstream, it turns southeast. After several hundred feet, it reaches its confluence with Huntington Creek.

Mitchler Run joins Huntington Creek 23.5 miles (37.8 km) upstream of its mouth.

=== Tributaries ===
No tributaries of Mitchler Run, named or unnamed, are shown on The National Map. However, a 1958 map by the Pennsylvania Fish Commission shows several unnamed tributaries (but no named tributaries) of the stream.

== Hydrology, geography, and watershed ==
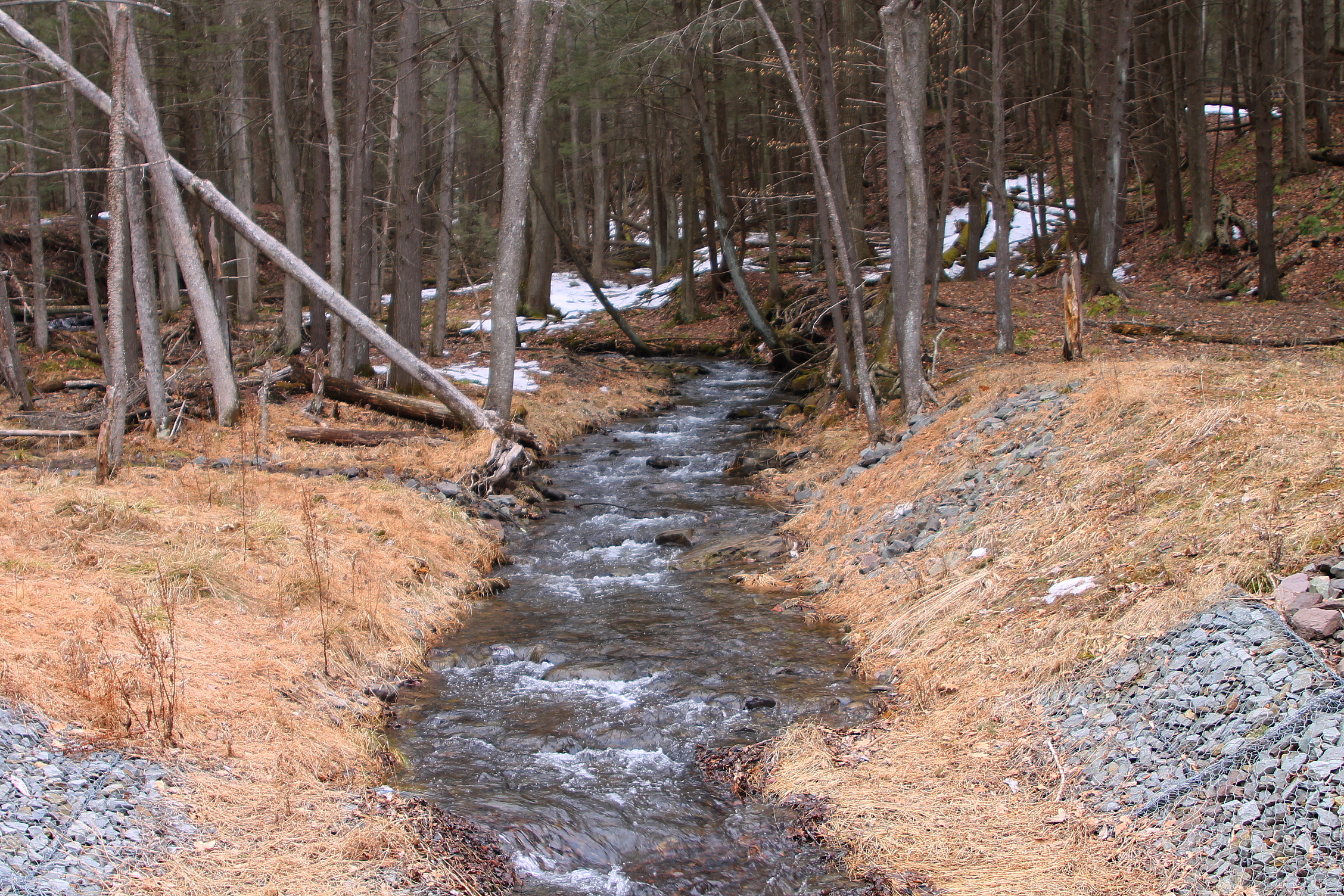
Mitchler Run looking upstream

The concentration of alkalinity in Mitchler Run is 20 milligrams per liter.

The elevation near the mouth of Mitchler Run is 1,089 feet (332 m) above sea level. The elevation of the stream's source is between 1,400 and 1,420 feet (430 and 430 m) above sea level.

The watershed of Mitchler Run has an area of 1.52 square miles (3.9 km^{2}). Mitchler Run is entirely in the United States Geological Survey quadrangle of Sweet Valley. The stream is also entirely on land that is private property and closed to the public.

== History ==
Mitchler Run's identifier in the Geographic Names Information System is 1181380. The stream was entered into the Geographic Names Information System on August 2, 1979. Mitchler Run has had its name since at least 1958, when it was on a map created by the Pennsylvania Fish Commission.

== Biology ==
Mitchler Run is considered by the Pennsylvania Fish and Boat Commission to be Class A Wild Trout Waters between its headwaters and its mouth. It is inhabited by brook trout. The stream is one of six direct tributaries of Huntington Creek to be designated as Class A Wild Trout Waters. The others are Shingle Run, Arnold Creek, Lick Branch, Phillips Creek, and part of Kitchen Creek.

== See also ==
- Laurel Run (Huntington Creek), next tributary of Huntington Creek going downstream
- List of tributaries of Fishing Creek (North Branch Susquehanna River)
- List of rivers of Pennsylvania
