= Arnold Creek (Huntington Creek tributary) =

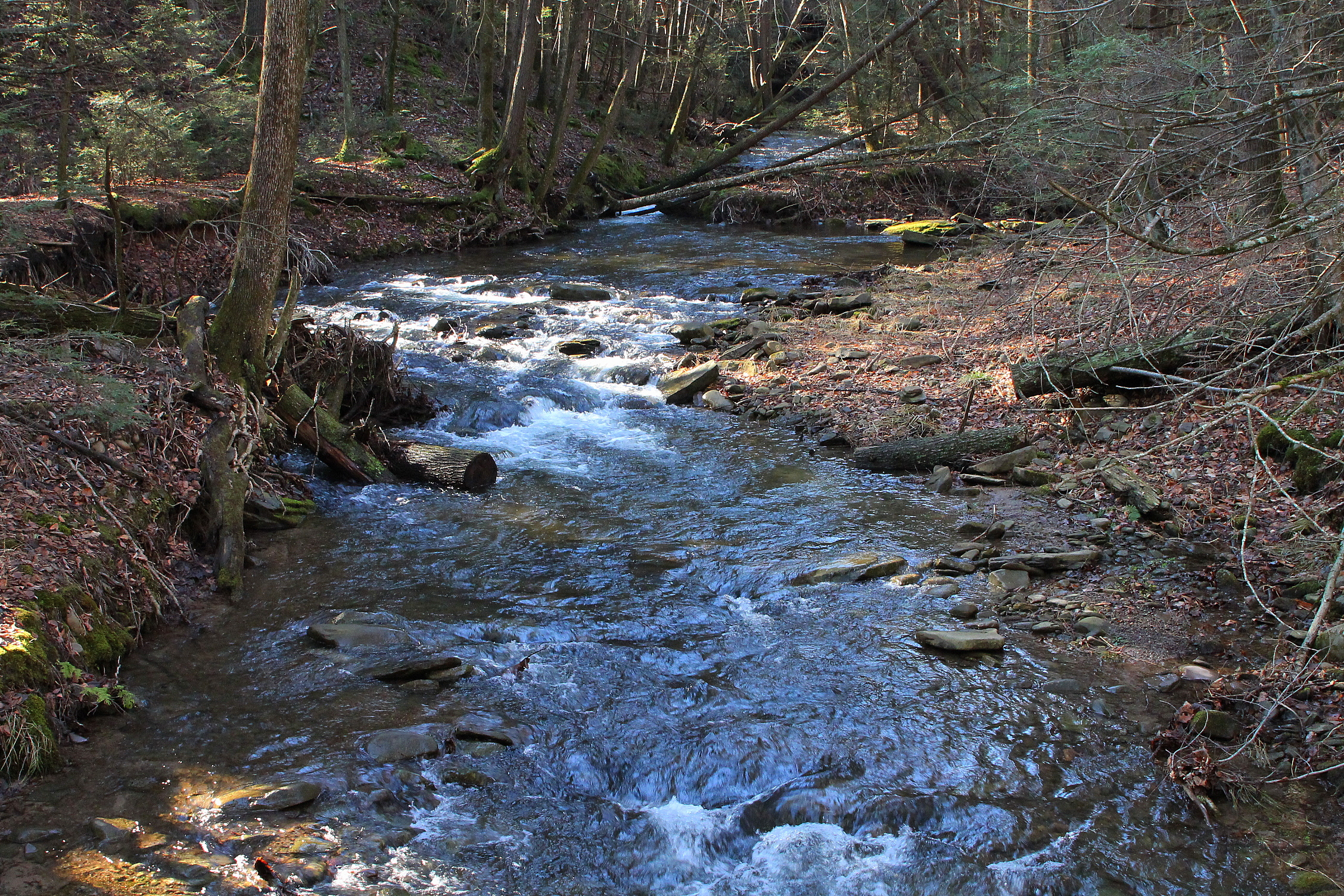
- Arnold Creek looking upstream

Physical characteristics
- Source
  - location: valley a short distance from the edge of the Bowman Creek watershed in Ross Township, Luzerne County, Pennsylvania
  - elevation: 1,960 ft (600 m)
- Mouth
  - location: Huntington Creek in Ross Township, Luzerne County, Pennsylvania
  - coordinates: 41°16′43″N 76°11′31″W
  - elevation: 935 ft (285 m)
- Length: 5.2 mi (8.4 km)
- Basin size: 4.72 mi^{2} (12.2 km^{2})

Basin features
- Progression: Huntington Creek → Fishing Creek → Susquehanna River → Chesapeake Bay
- Tributaries
  - left: two unnamed tributaries
  - right: one unnamed tributary

Arnold Creek is a tributary of Huntington Creek in Luzerne County, Pennsylvania, in the United States. It is approximately 5.2 miles (8.4 km) long and flows through Ross Township. The watershed of the creek has an area of 4.72 square miles (12.2 km^{2}) and has no named tributaries, but three unnamed tributaries. The creek is considered to be Class A Wild Trout Waters for its entire length. Brook trout naturally reproduce in it and beech trees occur along it. At least two bridges have been built over the creek, one of which carries Pennsylvania Route 118. A portion of it is in the Pennsylvania State Game Lands Number 206.

== Course ==
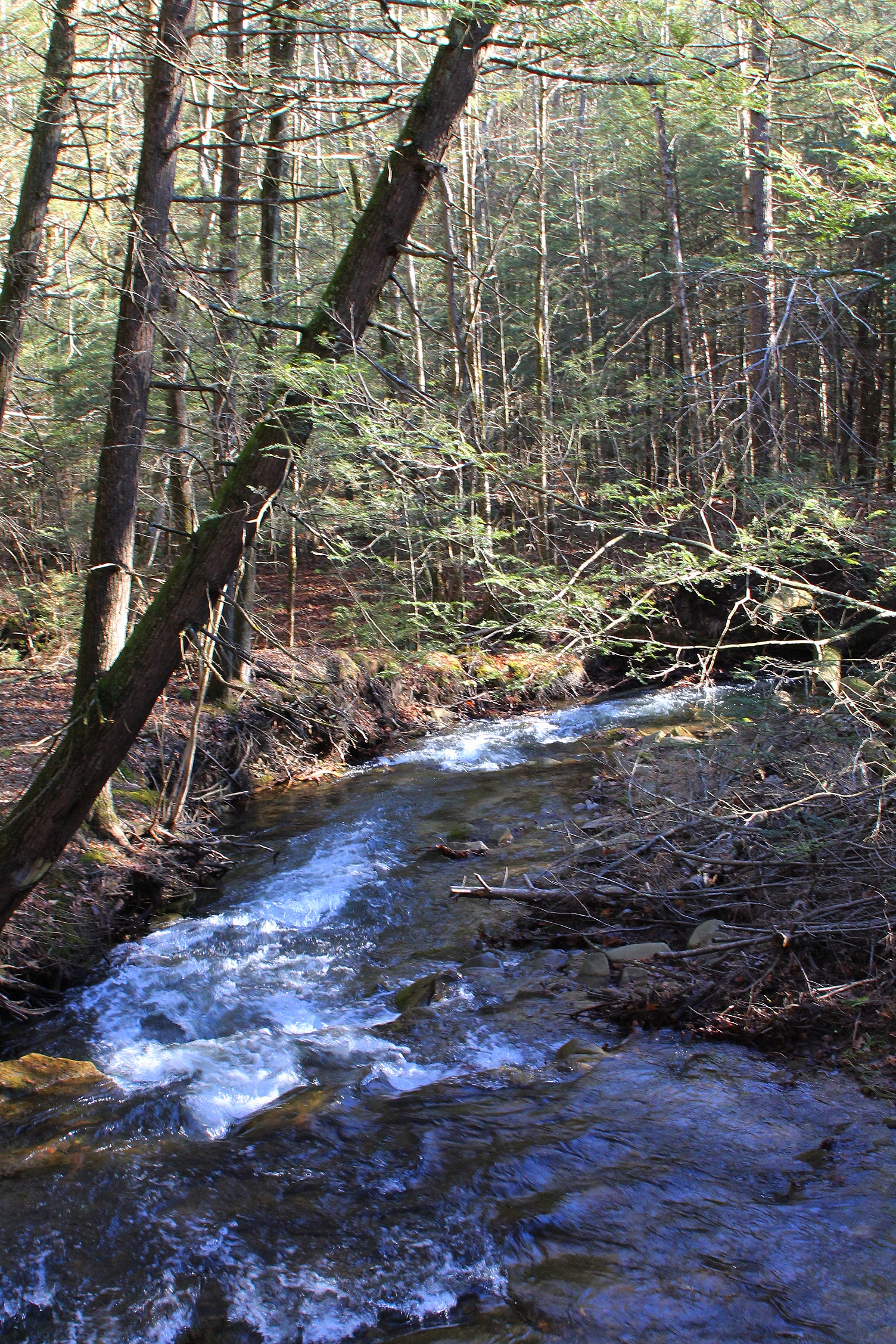
Arnold Creek looking downstream

Arnold Creek begins in a deep valley in Ross Township, only a few thousand feet from the edge of the watershed of Bowman Creek. It flows south-southwest for a few tenths of a mile before turning south-southeast for several tenths of a mile. The creek then receives an unnamed tributary from the left and flows south for more than a mile and its valley deepens. In this stretch, it receives two more unnamed tributaries: one from the left and one from the right. The creek's valley then becomes much shallower as it turns south-southwest and then south, crossing Pennsylvania Route 118 near the community of Kyttle. South of Pennsylvania Route 118, the creek turns south-southwest and flows around a bend before turning south-southeast for approximately a mile and a half. Its valley deepens again until the creek leaves the valley and reaches its confluence with Huntington Creek.

Arnold Creek joins Huntington Creek 21.18 miles (34.09 km) upstream of its mouth.

=== Tributaries ===
Arnold Creek has no named tributaries. However, it does have three unnamed tributaries.

== Hydrology and geography ==
Upstream of Pennsylvania Route 118, the concentration of alkalinity in Arnold Creek is 4 milligrams per liter. Downstream of Pennsylvania Route 118, the alkalinity concentration in the creek increases to 5 milligrams per liter.

The elevation near the mouth of Arnold Creek is 935 feet (285 m) above sea level. The elevation of the creek's source is approximately 1,960 feet (600 m) above sea level.

Pennsylvania Route 118 crosses Arnold Creek 2.7 miles (4.3 km) upstream of its mouth. The creek's mouth is north of the community of Harveyville.

== Watershed ==
The watershed of Huntington Creek has an area of 4.72 square miles (12.2 km^{2}).

Arnold Creek is entirely in the United States Geological Survey quadrangle of Sweet Valley. Upstream of Pennsylvania Route 118, 63 percent of the creek's length is open to the public. The remaining 37 percent is private land that is closed to the public. Downstream of Pennsylvania Route 118, only 59 percent of its length is open to the public. The remaining 41 percent is on private land that is closed to the public.

A portion of Arnold Creek is in Pennsylvania State Game Lands Number 206.

== History ==
Arnold Creek was entered into the Geographic Names Information System on August 2, 1979. Its identifier in the Geographic Names Information System is 1168410.

A prestressed box beam bridge was built over Arnold Creek in 1957. It is 24.9 feet (7.6 m) long and carries T-547 and Patla Road. Additionally, there is a bridge carrying Pennsylvania Route 118 over the creek 0.3 miles (0.48 km) west of State Route 4028. Plans were made in 1996 to rehabilitate the bridge for an estimated cost of $3,000. The entire length of the creek were designated as Class A Wild Trout Waters in 1999.

== Biology ==
Two sections of Arnold Creek are considered by the Pennsylvania Fish and Boat Commission to be Class A Wild Trout Waters. One section is approximately 2.3 miles (3.7 km) long and runs from the creek's headwaters to Pennsylvania Route 118. The other section is approximately 2.7 miles (4.3 km) long and runs from Pennsylvania Route 118 to the creek's mouth. Both sections are Class A Wild Trout Waters for brook trout. The creek is one of six direct tributaries of Huntington Creek to be designated as Class A Wild Trout Waters. The others are Mitchler Run, Shingle Run, Lick Branch, Phillips Creek, and part of Kitchen Creek. Arnold Creek supports a trout population that naturally reproduces.

There is a young stand of beech trees growing on Arnold Creek.

== See also ==
- Lick Branch (Huntington Creek), next tributary of Huntington Creek going downstream
- Shingle Run (Huntington Creek), next tributary of Huntington Creek going upstream
- List of tributaries of Fishing Creek (North Branch Susquehanna River)
