= Phillips Creek =

Phillips Creek Philips Creek
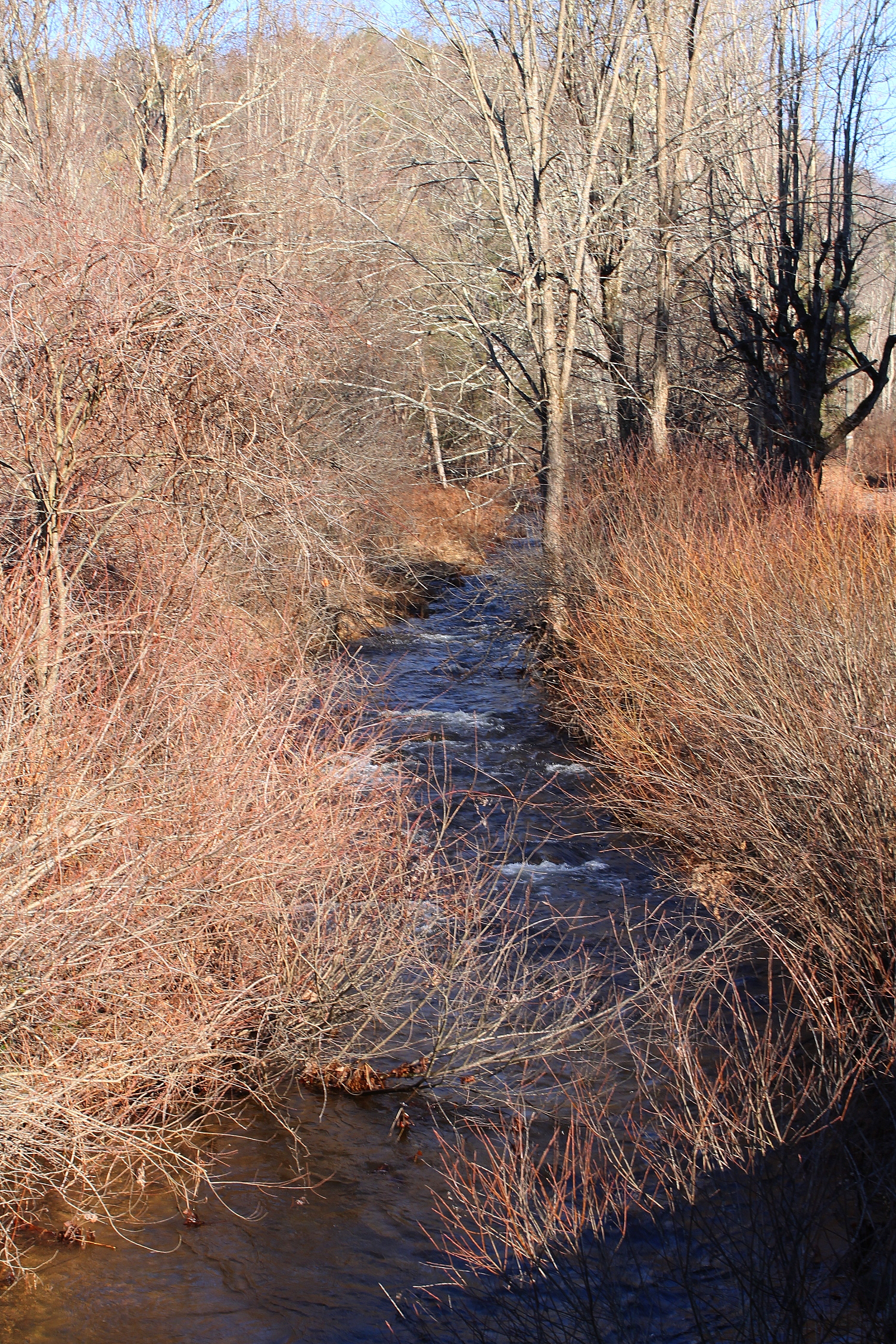
- Phillips Creek looking upstream

Physical characteristics
- Source
  - location: deep valley near North Mountain in Fairmount Township, Luzerne County, Pennsylvania
  - elevation: between 1,820 and 1,840 feet (550 and 560 m)
- Mouth
  - location: Huntington Creek in Fairmount Township, Luzerne County, Pennsylvania
  - coordinates: 41°16′05″N 76°13′26″W
  - elevation: 876 ft (267 m)
- Length: 5.3 mi (8.5 km)
- Discharge
  - average: 915 cu ft/s (25.9 m^{3}/s) Peak annual discharge at mouth (10 percent probability)

Basin features
- Progression: Huntington Creek → Fishing Creek → Susquehanna River → Chesapeake Bay
- Tributaries
  - left: one unnamed tributary
  - right: one unnamed tributary

Phillips Creek (also known as Philips Creek) is a tributary of Huntington Creek in Luzerne County, Pennsylvania, in the United States. It is approximately 5.3 miles (8.5 km) long and flows through Fairmount Township. The watershed of the creek has an area of 5.54 square miles (14.3 km^{2}) and has no named tributaries. The creek is considered by the Pennsylvania Fish and Boat Commission to be Class A Wild Trout Waters for brook trout throughout its entire length. Glacial till, alluvium, sandstone, and shale can be found in its vicinity. Its course has been altered by glaciation and it is in the vicinity of North Mountain. At least one bridge has been built over the creek and a number of hunting cabins and cottages existed in the area. The creek's discharge has a 10 percent chance of reaching 915 cubic feet per second in any given year.

== Course ==
Phillips Creek begins in a deep valley near North Mountain in Fairmount Township. It flows south for nearly a mile before passing through a pond and receiving two unnamed tributaries, one from the left and one from the right. The creek then flows south-southeast for a considerable distance before leaving the valley and crossing Pennsylvania Route 118. It then turns southwest and then west, entering another valley between Jackson Hill and Bethel Hill. The creek flows south-southwest and then south-southeast for approximately two miles (three kilometers). It then leaves the valley and reaches its confluence with Huntington Creek.

Phillips Creek joins Huntington Creek 19.12 miles (30.77 km) upstream of its mouth.

=== Tributaries ===
Phillips Creek has no officially named tributaries. However, it does have several unnamed tributaries.

== Hydrology ==
The concentration of alkalinity in the waters of Phillips Creek is 6 milligrams per liter.

At the mouth of Phillips Creek, its discharge has a 10 percent chance of reaching 915 cubic feet per second in any given year. It has a 2 percent chance of reaching 1630 cubic feet per second and a 1 percent chance of reaching 2015 cubic feet per second. The creek has a 0.2 percent chance of reaching a top discharge of 3177 cubic feet per second in any given year.

== Geography and geology ==
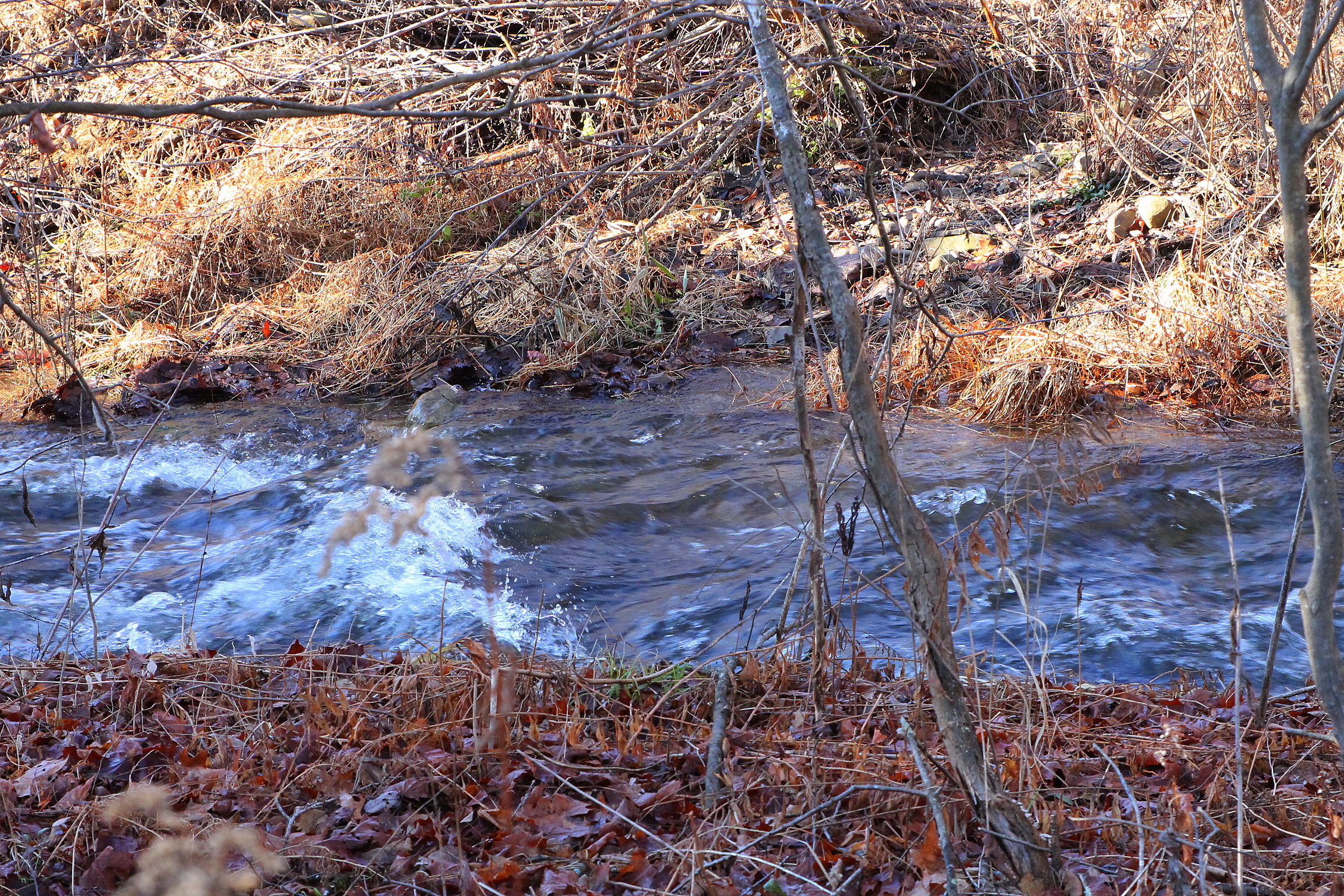
Closeup of Phillips Creek

The elevation near the mouth of Phillips Creek is 876 feet (267 m) above sea level. The elevation of the creek's source is between 1,820 and 1,840 feet (550 and 560 m). Its elevation at the base of North Mountain is approximately 1,200 feet (370 m) above sea level.

The headwaters of Phillips Creek are in North Mountain. The creek has an obstruction in its lower reaches, near Huntington Road. The Gauckler–Manning coefficient value of the creek is 0.045 for its channel and ranges from 0.070 to 0.100 for its overbank.

Phillips Creek attempted to flow down the valley of Lick Branch prior to the glaciation of the area. However, a mass of till under Pennsylvania Route 118 diverted it over a saddle to the west, causing it to end up in its present course. There is a series of waterfalls at the point where the creek is cutting through the saddle. A portion of the creek is located in a deep and narrow gorge. Shortly after they were created, the gorge and the waterfalls were deepened by Lake Bowman, a nearby glacial lake. Downstream of the saddle, the creek is an "overfit stream", meaning that it is too wide for its valley. For this reason, the gorge is gradually widening. A deep col is located between the creek and the valley of Bowman Creek. The col contains a wide ledge of sandstone at 1,940 feet (590 m) above sea level.

In its lower reaches, Phillips Creek is surrounded by bedrock made of interbedded reddish-gray shale and sandstone. Some areas near the creek are on Wisconsinan Till. Most of the till in the vicinity of the creek is expected to be more than 6 feet (1.8 m) thick. Wisconsinan Ice-Contact Stratified Drift and alluvium are also found along parts of the stream, especially in its middle and upper reaches. Additionally, an alluvial fan is present in the creek's upper reaches.

== Watershed ==
The watershed of Phillips Creek has an area of 5.54 square miles (14.3 km^{2}). The creek is entirely within the United States Geological Survey quadrangle of Sweet Valley.

Phillips Creek is one of the main sources of flooding in Fairmount Township, along with Kitchen Creek. The creek flooded in 1972 and 1975. A number of hunting cabins and cottages existed in the watershed in the 1970s. At the time, these were the only disturbances to the forests on North Mountain There is a small lake in the upper reaches of the creek.

== History ==
Phillips Creek was entered into the Geographic Names Information System on August 2, 1979. Its identifier in the Geographic Names Information System is 1183672.

A prestressed box beam bridge was constructed over Phillips Creek in 1993. It is 34.1 feet (10.4 m) long and carries Huntington Creek Road. In 1991, plans were made to replace a bridge carrying the road T-620 over the creek for a cost of $277,000.

== Biology ==
A section of Phillips Creek is considered by the Pennsylvania Fish and Boat Commission to be Class A Wild Trout Waters for brook trout. This section stretches approximately 1.8 miles (2.9 km) from the creek's headwaters to Pennsylvania Route 118. The section of the creek that stretches from Pennsylvania Route 118 to its mouth is also considered to be Class A Wild Trout Waters, but for both brook trout and brown trout. This section is 3.2 miles (5.1 km) long. The creek is one of six direct tributaries of Huntington Creek to be designated as Class A Wild Trout Waters. The others are Mitchler Run, Shingle Run, Arnold Creek, Lick Branch, and part of Kitchen Creek. However, Phillips Creek was stocked in 1933–1934.

In the early 1900s, mammals such as bobcats and bears were observed in the vicinity of Phillips Creek.

== See also ==
- Kitchen Creek (Pennsylvania), next tributary of Huntington Creek going downstream
- Lick Branch, next tributary of Huntington Creek going upstream
- List of tributaries of Fishing Creek (North Branch Susquehanna River)
