= Lick Branch (Huntington Creek tributary) =

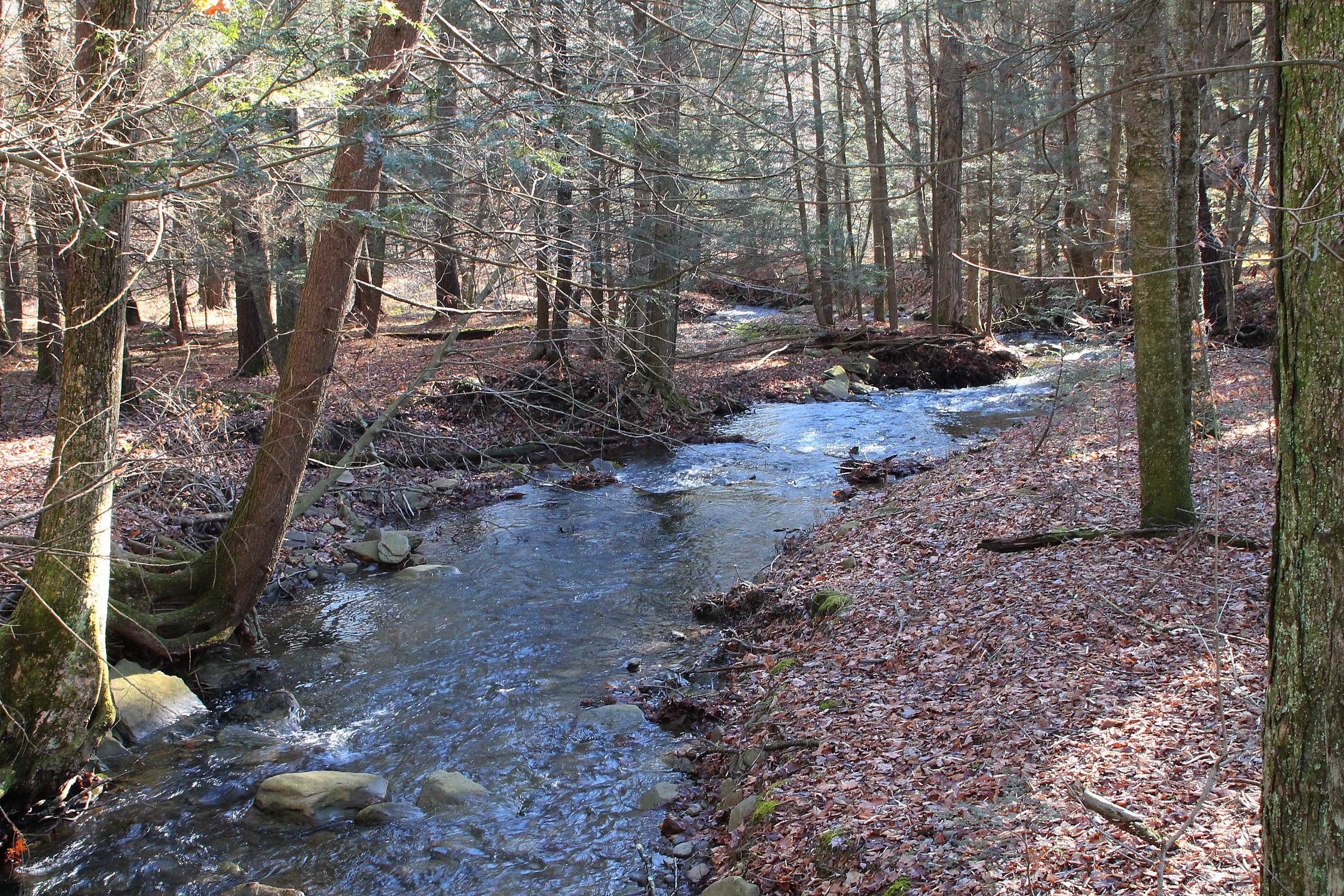
- Lick Branch looking downstream

Physical characteristics
- Source
  - location: steep valley in the foothills of North Mountain in Ross Township, Luzerne County, Pennsylvania
  - elevation: between 1,300 and 1,320 feet (400 and 400 m)
- Mouth
  - location: Huntington Creek in Ross Township, Luzerne County, Pennsylvania
  - coordinates: 41°16′27″N 76°12′49″W
  - elevation: 899 ft (274 m)
- Length: 2.6 mi (4.2 km)
- Basin size: 2.34 sq mi (6.1 km^{2})

Basin features
- Progression: Huntington Creek → Fishing Creek → Susquehanna River → Chesapeake Bay

Lick Branch is a tributary of Huntington Creek in Luzerne County, Pennsylvania, in the United States. It is approximately 2.6 miles (4.2 km) long and flows through Ross Township and Fairmount Township. The watershed of the stream has an area of 2.34 square miles (6.1 km^{2}) and has no tributaries. The stream is considered by the Pennsylvania Fish and Boat Commission to be Class A Wild Trout Waters for brook trout throughout its entire length. Glacial till, alluvium, and wetlands can be found in its vicinity.

== Course ==
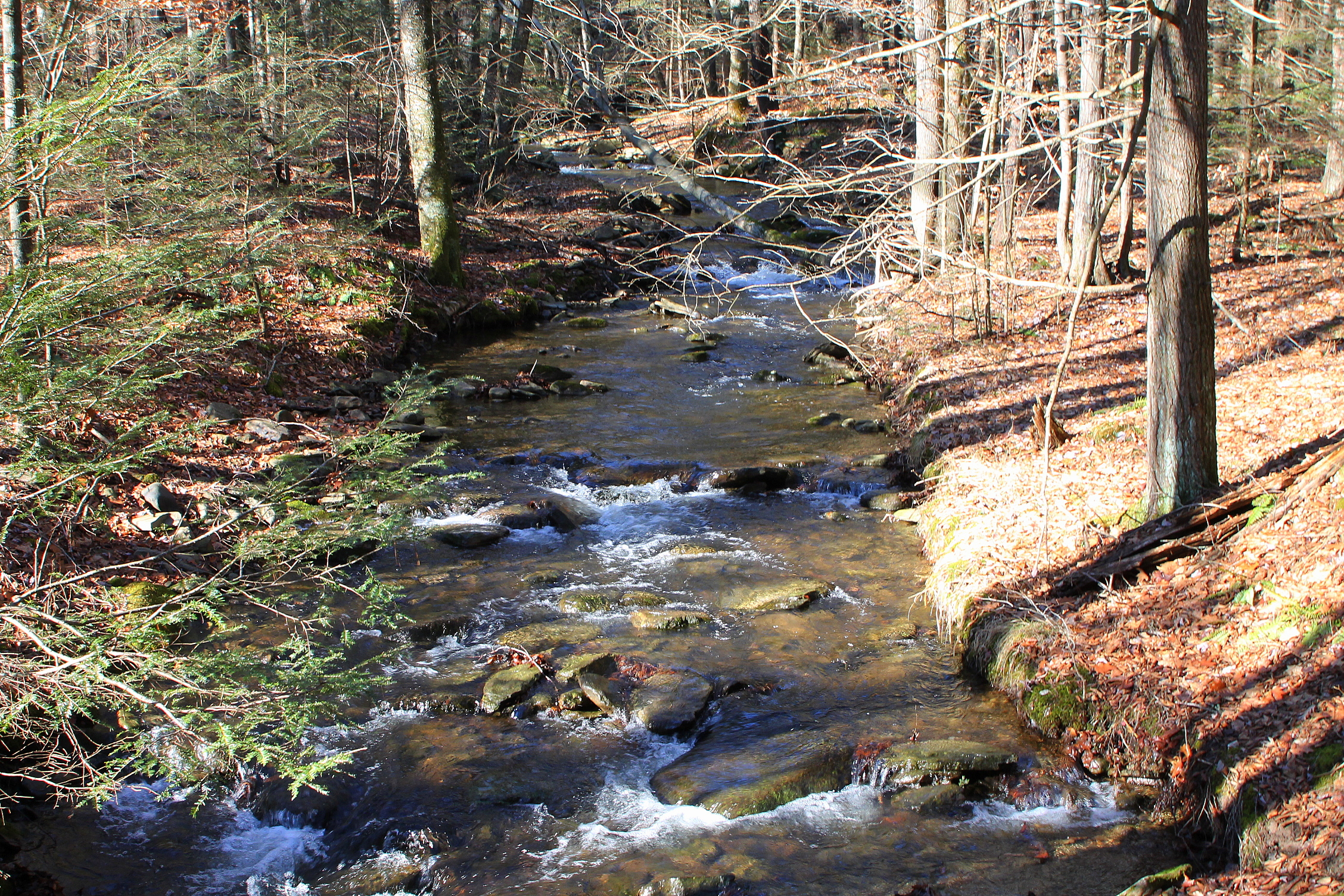
Lick Branch looking upstream

Lick Branch begins in a steep valley in the foothills of North Mountain, just south of Pennsylvania Route 118 in western Ross Township. The stream flows southwest and enters Fairmount Township. In Fairmount Township, it turns south and then south-southeast, reentering Ross Township and its valley deepens. In Ross Township, the stream continues flowing south-southwest for more than a mile, while its valley deepens. It then turns southeast and then south, leaving the valley and reaching its confluence with Huntington Creek.

Lick Branch joins Huntington Creek 19.64 miles (31.61 km) upstream of its mouth.

=== Tributaries ===
Lick Branch has no tributaries, named or unnamed.

== Hydrology, geography, and geology ==
The concentration of alkalinity in the waters of Lick Branch is 9 milligrams per liter.

The elevation near the mouth of Lick Branch is 899 feet (274 m) above sea level. The elevation of the creek's source is between 1,300 and 1,320 feet (400 and 400 m) above sea level.

Most of the length of Lick Branch is on Wisconsinan Till. Most of the till in the vicinity of the stream is expected to be more than 6 feet (1.8 m) thick. Near the stream's mouth and also a few areas in its middle reaches, there are areas of alluvium. In the valley of the stream, the alluvium is approximately 6 feet (1.8 m). Nearer to the valley of Huntington Creek, the alluvium is 10 feet (3.0 m) thick or more. Additionally, there is a wetland in the stream's upper reaches.

Phillips Creek attempted to flow down the valley of Lick Branch prior to the glaciation of the area. However, a mass of till under Pennsylvania Route 118 diverted it to its present course.

== Watershed ==
The watershed of Lick Branch has an area of 2.34 square miles (6.1 km^{2}). Both the mouth and the source of the stream are in the United States Geological Survey quadrangle of Sweet Valley. A total of 3 percent of the stream's length is on public land. The remaining 97 percent is in private land that is closed to the public.

== History ==
Lick Branch has had its name since at least 1958, when it was on a map created by the Pennsylvania Fish Commission. The stream was entered into the Geographic Names Information System on August 2, 1979. Its identifier in the Geographic Names Information System is 1179276. The stream was designated as Class A Wild Trout Waters by the Pennsylvania Fish and Boat Commission in 1999.

== Biology ==
Lick Branch is considered by the Pennsylvania Fish and Boat Commission to be Class A Wild Trout Waters for brook trout between its headwaters and its mouth. The stream is one of six direct tributaries of Huntington Creek to be designated as Class A Wild Trout Waters. The others are Mitchler Run, Shingle Run, Arnold Creek, Phillips Creek, and part of Kitchen Creek.

== See also ==
- Phillips Creek, next tributary of Huntington Creek going downstream
- Arnold Creek (Huntington Creek), next tributary of Huntington Creek going upstream
- List of tributaries of Fishing Creek (North Branch Susquehanna River)
