= Laurel Run (Huntington Creek tributary) =

Laurel Run Laurel Run Creek
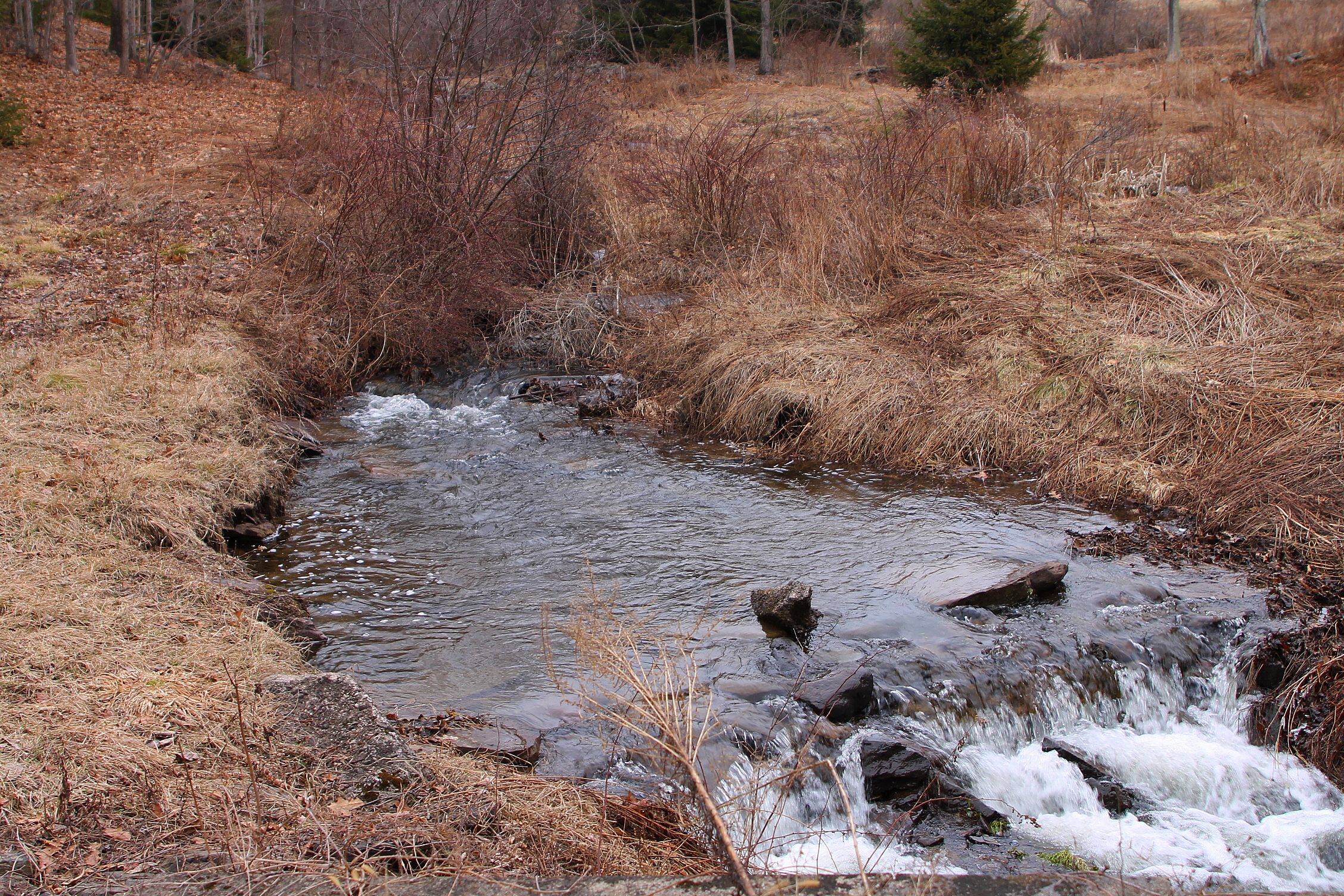
- Laurel Run looking upstream

Physical characteristics
- Source
  - location: valley in Ross Township, Luzerne County, Pennsylvania
  - elevation: between 1,300 and 1,320 feet (400 and 400 m)
- Mouth
  - location: Huntington Creek in Ross Township, Luzerne County, Pennsylvania
  - coordinates: 41°17′21″N 76°10′13″W
  - elevation: 1,043 ft (318 m)
- Length: 1.8 mi (2.9 km)
- Basin size: 1.29 mi^{2} (3.3 km^{2})

Basin features
- Progression: Huntington Creek → Fishing Creek → Susquehanna River → Chesapeake Bay

Laurel Run (also known as Laurel Run Creek) is a tributary of Huntington Creek, in Luzerne County, Pennsylvania, in the United States. It is approximately 1.8 miles (2.9 km) long and flows through Ross Township. The watershed of the stream has an area of 1.29 square miles (3.3 km^{2}). Wild trout naturally reproduce in the stream. The surficial geology in the area mainly consists of Wisconsinan Till, Wisconsinan Ice-Contact Stratified Drift, and bedrock consisting of sandstone and shale. The stream is designated as a Least Disturbed Stream.

== Course ==
Laurel Run begins in a valley in Ross Township. It flows west-southwest for nearly a mile alongside Dobson Road before turning southwest for a short distance. The stream then turns west-southwest again for several tenths of a mile before crossing State Route 4024 and reaching its confluence with Huntington Creek.

Laurel Run joins Huntington Creek 22.82 miles (36.73 km) upstream of its mouth.

== Geography and geology ==
The elevation near the mouth of Laurel Run is 1,043 feet (318 m) above sea level. The elevation of the stream's source is between 1,300 and 1,320 feet (400 and 400 m) above sea level.

Laurel Run is in the Susquehanna Lowlands section of the ridge and valley physiographic province.

For most of the length of Laurel Run, the surficial geology in its vicinity consists of a glacial or resedimented till known as Wisconsinan Till. On the sides of its valley, there is bedrock consisting of sandstone and shale. At the mouth of the stream, the surficial geology features Wisconsinan Ice-Contact Stratified Drift, which contains stratified sand and gravel, as well as some boulders.

== Watershed ==
The watershed of Laurel Run has an area of 1.29 square miles (3.3 km^{2}). The stream is entirely within the United States Geological Survey quadrangle of Sweet Valley.

Laurel Run is classified as a Least Disturbed Stream by the Pennsylvania Natural Heritage Program. Such streams are described as "high-quality stream segments" that "ideally have little disturbance from human influences and demonstrate natural ecological function".

Less than 0.75 percent of the watershed of Laurel Run is developed and less than 32.5 percent is agricultural land. More than 75 percent of the watershed is on forested land. More than 80 percent of the stream's riparian zone is forested, while less than 15 percent is agricultural and less than 1 percent is developed.

There are no dams or instances of point source pollution in the watershed of Laurel Run. There are fewer than five road crossings.

== History ==
Laurel Run was entered into the Geographic Names Information System on August 2, 1979. Its identifier in the Geographic Names Information System is 1178994.

In the early 1900s, the Commissioners of Luzerne County requested permission to construct a bridge over Laurel Run. The road was to be a reinforced concrete slab bridge on the road from Mooretown to Sweet Valley.

== Biology ==
Wild trout naturally reproduce in Laurel Run from its headwaters downstream to its mouth.

== See also ==
- Shingle Run (Huntington Creek), next tributary of Huntington Creek going downstream
- Mitchler Run, next tributary of Huntington Creek going upstream
- List of tributaries of Fishing Creek (North Branch Susquehanna River)
- List of rivers of Pennsylvania
