= Blue Ribbon fishery =

High quality fishery designation in the United States

A Blue Ribbon fishery is a designation made in the United States by government and other authorities to identify recreational fisheries of extremely high quality. Official Blue Ribbon status is generally based on a set of established criteria which typically addresses the following elements:

- Water quality and quantity: A body of water, warm or cold, flowing or flat, will be considered for Blue Ribbon status if it has sufficient water quality and quantity to sustain a viable fishery.
- Water accessibility: The water must be accessible to the public.
- Natural reproduction capacity: The body of water should possess a natural capacity to produce and maintain a sustainable recreational fishery. There must be management strategies that will consistently produce fish of significant size and/or numbers to provide a quality angling experience.
- Angling pressure: The water must be able to withstand angling pressure.
- Specific species: Selection may be based on a specific species.

Criteria as used by Utah Division of Wildlife Resources. Specific criteria may vary by state.

Many quality recreational fisheries are informally referred to as Blue Ribbon by government agencies, tourist, media, environmental, sportsman organizations and writers, but are not officially designated as such by established criteria.

== States with official Blue Ribbon fishery designations ==
- Michigan
- Missouri
- Montana, Montana recently converted their blue/red ribbon designations to a class system.
- Pennsylvania has a Class A Wild Trout Waters system.
- Utah
- Wisconsin – classified as Class I trout streams
- Wyoming – classifies according to the number of pounds of trout per mile

== Books ==
- Sunderland, Bill (1991). California: Blue Ribbon Trout Streams. Portland, OR: Frank Amato. ISBN 1-878175-00-9.
- Dentry, Ed (1994). Blue ribbon rivers of the Rockies: Rocky Mountain News fishing guide to the West's best streams. Denver: Denver Publishing Company. ISBN 0-914807-13-7.
- McLennan, Jim (1999). Blue Ribbon Bow a Fly Fishing history of the Bow River, Canada's Greatest Trout Stream. Red Deer, Alberta: Johnson Gorman Publishers. ISBN 0-921835-51-5.
- Shewey, John (1999). Washington Blue-Ribbon Fly Fishing Guide. Portland, OR: Frank Amato Publications. ISBN 1-57188-134-4.
- Hanley, Ken; Shewey, John (1999). Mexico Blue Ribbon Fly Fishing Guide: Largemouth Bass to Big Game. Portland, OR: Frank Amato Publications. ISBN 1-57188-154-9.
- Murray, Harry (2000). Virginia Blue-Ribbon Streams-A Fly Fishing Guide. Portland, OR: Frank Amato Publishers. ISBN 1-57188-159-X.
- Cook, Steve (2001). Rocky Mountain Fly Fishing: Blue Ribbon Rivers of the American West. Salt Lake City: Utah Outdoors. ISBN 0-9671738-6-8.
- Thomas, Greg (2001). Wyoming-Blue Ribbon Fly Fishing Guide. Portland, OR: Frank Amato Publications. ISBN 1-57188-164-6.
- Halla, R. Chris (2002). Wisconsin Blue-Ribbon Trout Streams. Portland, OR: Frank Amato Publications. ISBN 1-57188-161-1.
- Linsenman, Bob (2002). Michigan Blue-Ribbon Trout Streams. Portland, OR: Frank Amato Publications. ISBN 1-57188-160-3.
- Beck, Barry; Beck, Cathy (2002). Pennsylvania Blue-Ribbon Fly-Fishing Guide. Portland, OR: Frank Amato Publications. ISBN 1-57188-158-1.
- Hicks, Danny (2002). Ozark Blue-Ribbon Trout Streams. Portland, OR: Frank Amato Publications. ISBN 1-57188-163-8.
- Rutter, Ian (2003). Tennessee Trout Waters: Blue-Ribbon Fly-Fishing Guide. Portland, OR: Frank Amato. ISBN 1-57188-294-4.
- Williams, Mark D. (2007). So Many Fish, So Little Time: 1001 of the World's Greatest Backcountry Honeyholes, Trout Rivers, Blue Ribbon Waters, Bass Lakes, and Saltwater Hot Spots. Scarborough, Ontario: Harper Collins Publishers Canada Limited. ISBN 978-0-06-088239-6.
