= Creeping snowberry =

Creeping snowberry is a common name for several plants and may refer to:

- Gaultheria hispidula
- Symphoricarpos hesperius
- Symphoricarpos mollis
