= Swamp currant =

Swamp currant is a common name for several flowering plants and may refer to:

- Ribes humile, native to China
- Ribes lacustre, native to North America
- Ribes triste, native to North America
