= Sweet Valley, Pennsylvania =

Unincorporated community in Pennsylvania, U.S.

Coordinates: 41°16′56″N 76°08′41″W

Sweet Valley is an unincorporated community in Ross Township, Luzerne County, in the U.S. state of Pennsylvania.

== History ==
A post office called Sweet Valley has been in operation since 1847. Josiah Ruggles was the first postmaster, and the community's first merchant.

== Gallery ==
A view of Sweet Valley, Pennsylvania, about 1930

A view of North Lake, Sweet Valley, Pennsylvania, about 1940

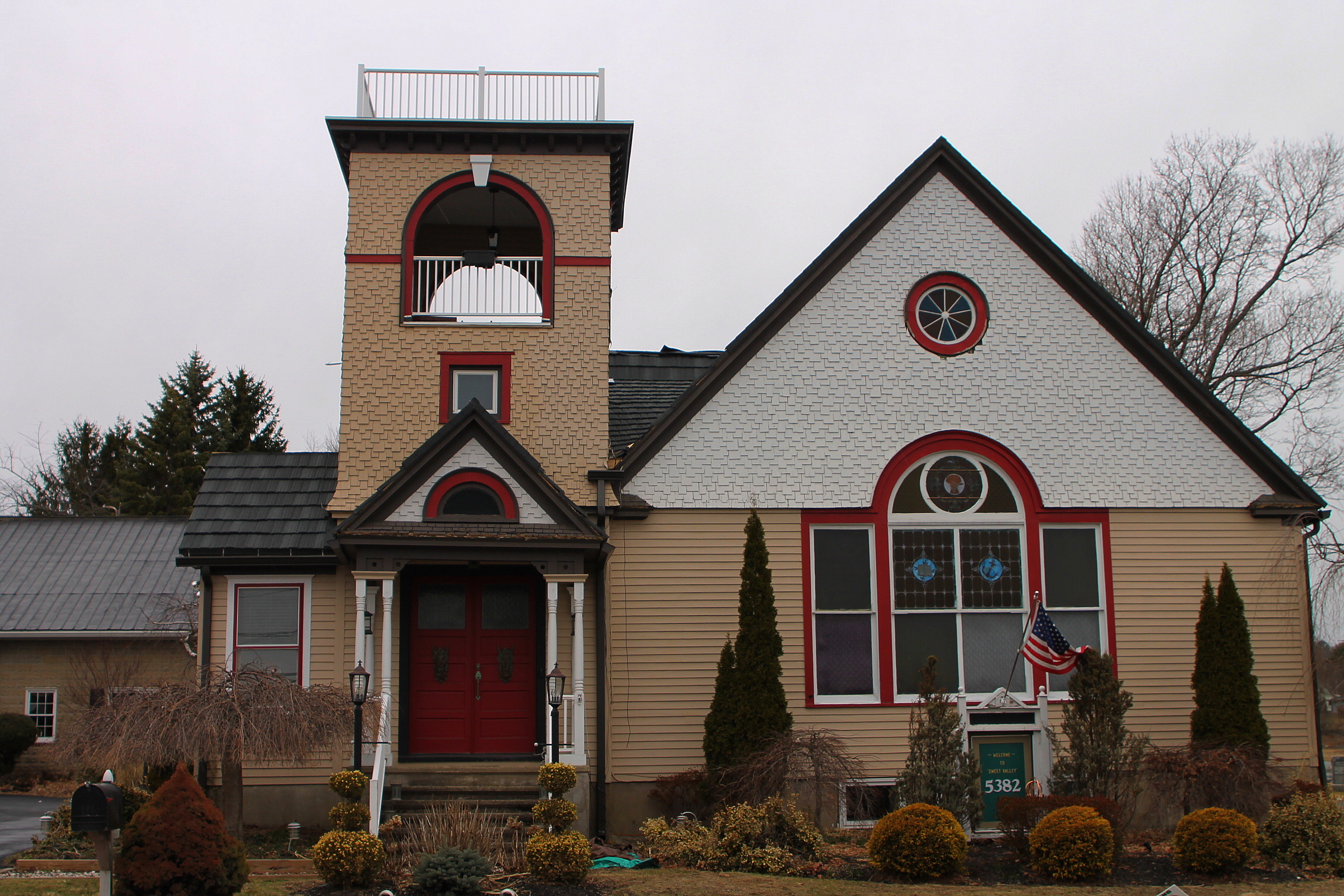
Church in Sweet Valley in 2009

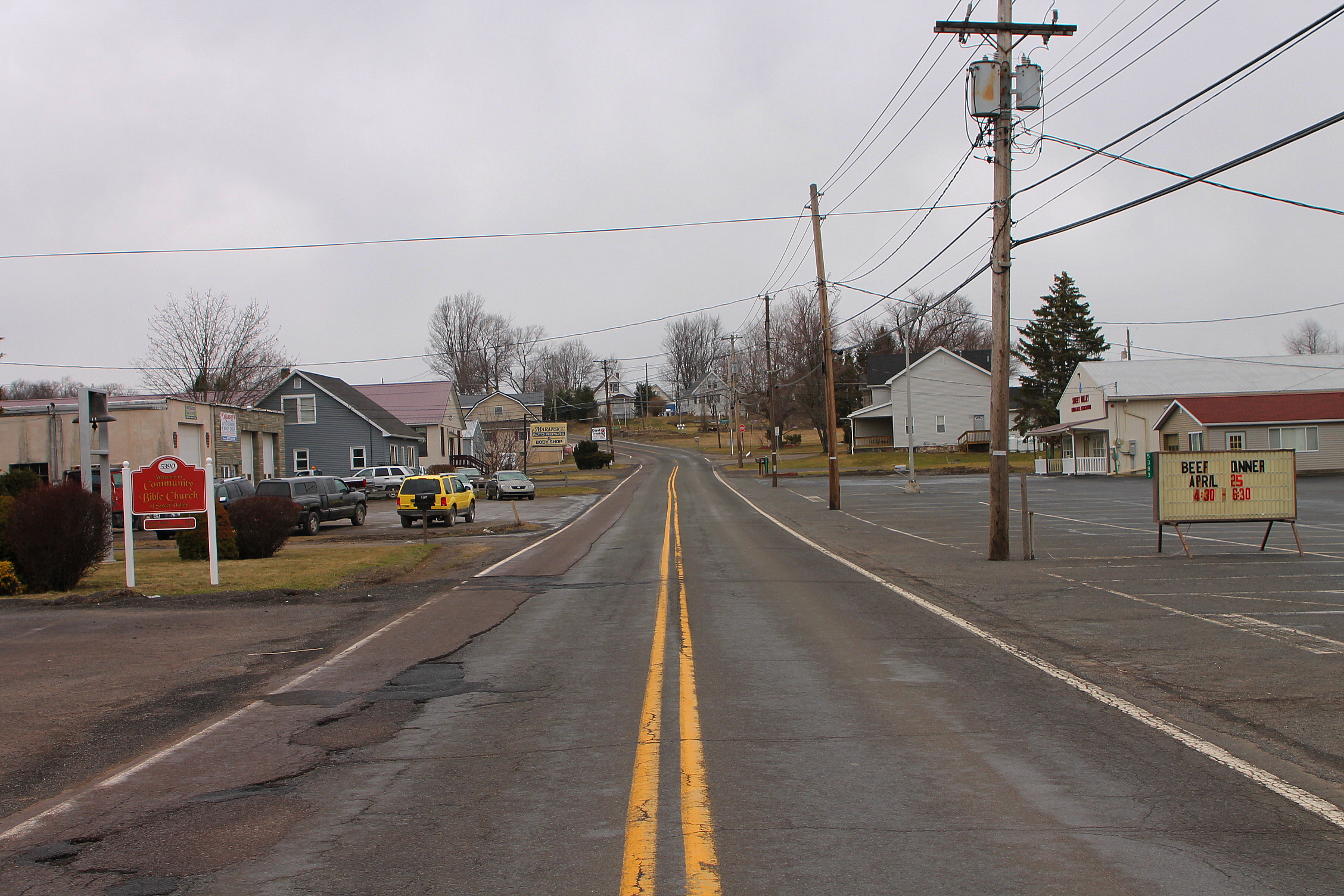
Main Road in Sweet Valley in 2015

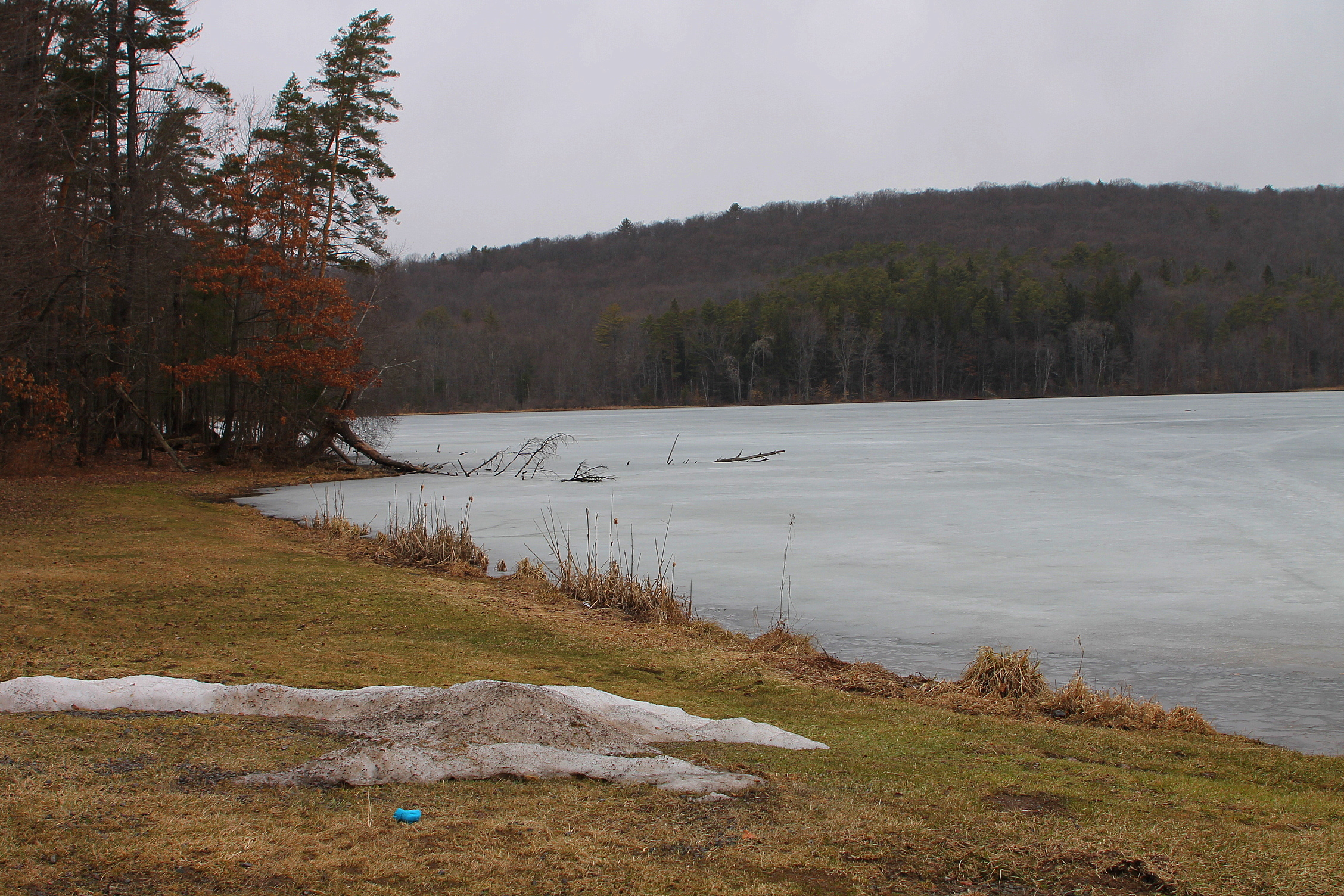
A View of Harris Pond in 2015
