= Ross Township, Luzerne County, Pennsylvania =

Township in Pennsylvania, US

Coordinates: 41°14′00″N 76°11′59″W

- Township
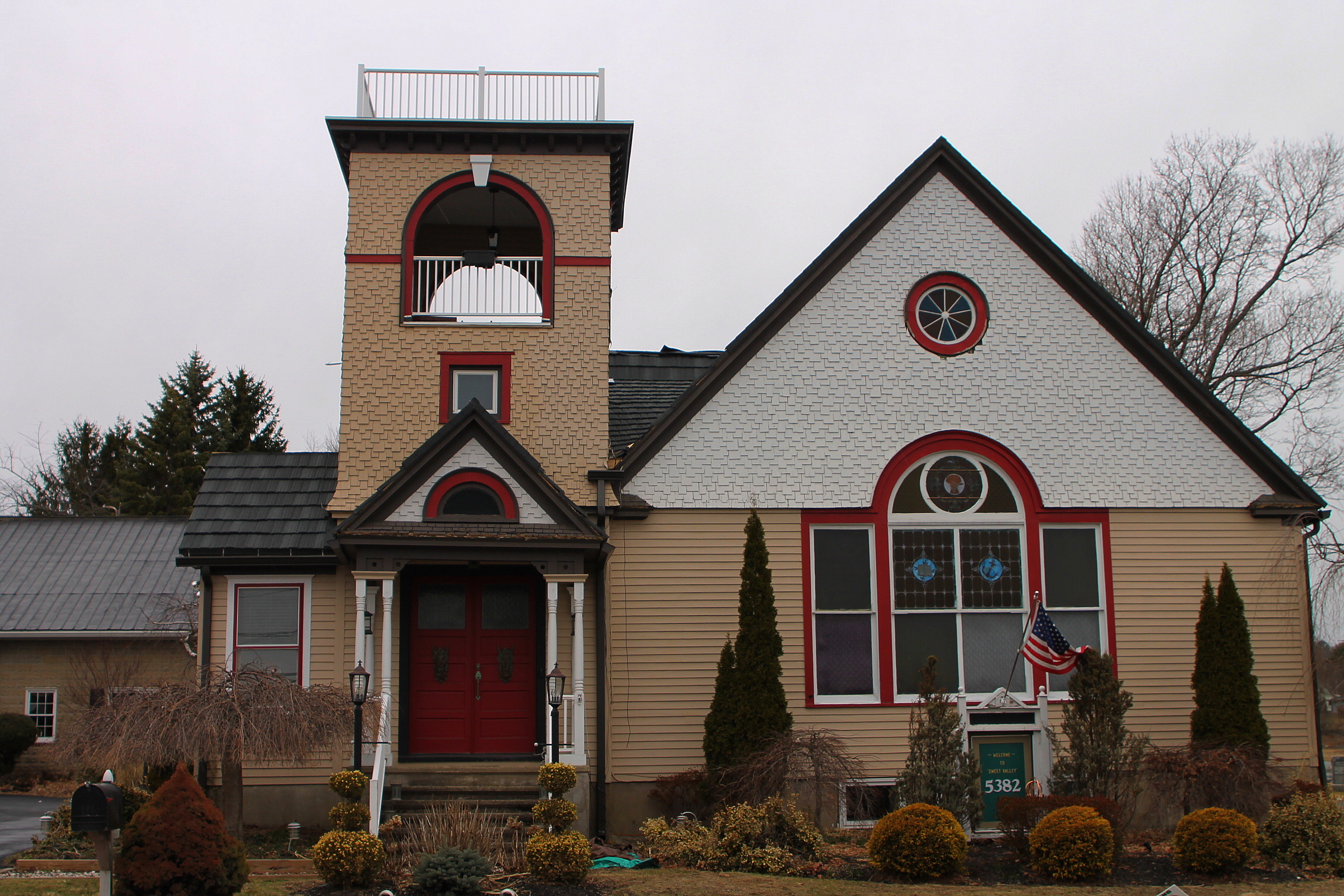
- Church in Ross Township

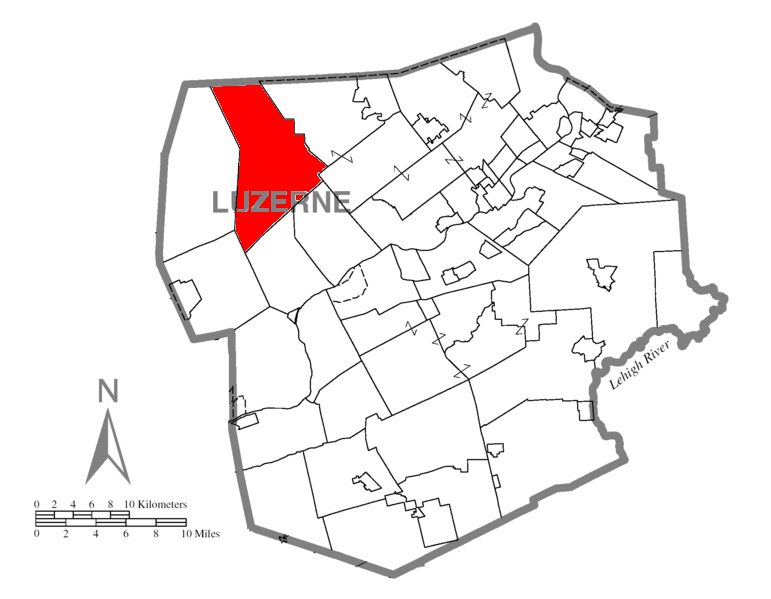
- Map of Luzerne County highlighting Ross Township

- Map of Pennsylvania highlighting Luzerne County
- Country: United States
- State: Pennsylvania
- County: Luzerne
- Incorporated: 1842

Area
  - Total: 43.93 sq mi (113.77 km^{2})
  - Land: 43.42 sq mi (112.45 km^{2})
  - Water: 0.51 sq mi (1.32 km^{2})

Population (2020)
  - Total: 2,719 ▼
  - Estimate (2021): 2,727
  - Density: 66.7/sq mi (25.75/km^{2})
- Time zone: UTC-5 (Eastern (EST))
  - Summer (DST): UTC-4 (EDT)
- FIPS code: 42-079-66272

Ross Township is a township in Luzerne County, Pennsylvania, United States. The population was 2,719 at the 2020 census.

== History ==
One of the first white settlers in modern-day Ross Township was Daniel Devore in 1793. He was followed by a Connecticut settler named Abram Kitchen in 1795. Timothy, Aaron, and Jacob Meeker settled west of Grassy Pond the following year. Additional settlers followed in their footsteps. The first schoolhouse was built in 1820.

Ross Township was formed in January 1842 from Lehman and Union Townships; it was named in honor of General William S. Ross (who was a Luzerne County Judge at the time). In 1843, John A. Hess was elected the township's justice of the peace.

Sweet Valley, Ross Township (circa 1930)

North Lake in Sweet Valley (circa 1940)

== Geography ==
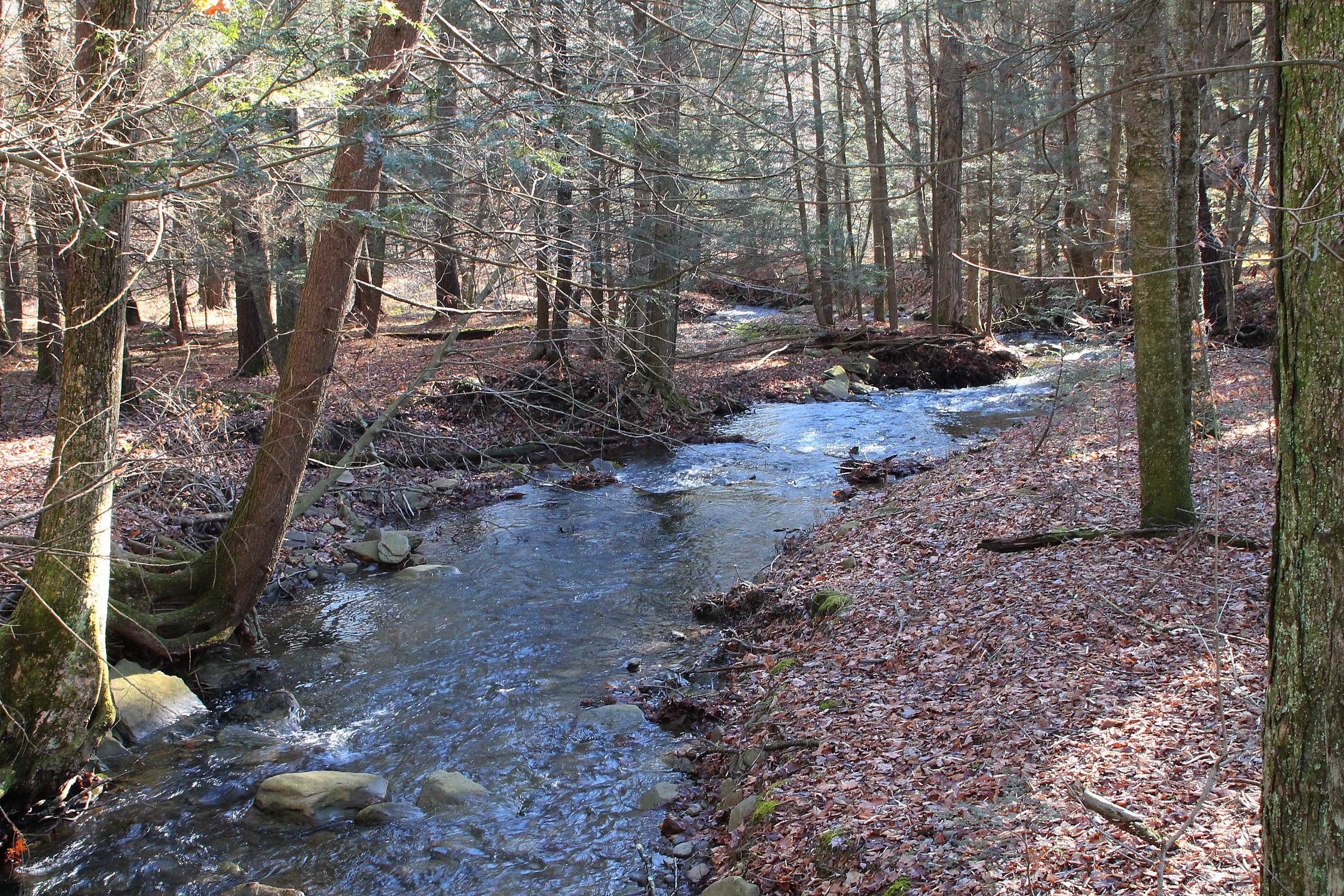
Lick Branch in Ross Township

According to the United States Census Bureau, the township has a total area of 43.9 square miles (113.8 km^{2}), of which 43.4 square miles (112.4 km^{2}) is land and 0.50 square miles (1.3 km^{2}), or 1.16%, is water. Bloomingdale and Sweet Valley are two communities in Ross Township. Most of the population resides in the central and southern portions of the municipality. PA 118 runs east to west through the middle of the township. Farmland and forests make up the southern half of the community, while only thick forests and mountains make up the north.

Lakes (e.g., Harris Pond and North Lake) and streams (e.g., Lick Branch and Mitchler Run) are also scattered throughout the township. The eastern section of Ricketts Glen State Park is located in northern Ross Township.

=== Adjacent communities ===
- Forkston Township (north)
- Lake Township (east)
- Lehman Township (southeast)
- Hunlock Township (south)
- Union Township (south)
- Huntington Township (southwest)
- Fairmount Township (west)

== Demographics ==
Historical population
| Census | Pop. | Note | %± |
|---|---|---|---|
| 2000 | 2,742 | | — |
| 2010 | 2,937 | | 7.1% |
| 2020 | 2,719 | | −7.4% |
| 2021 (est.) | 2,727 | | 0.3% |
U.S. Decennial Census

As of the census of 2000, there were 2,742 people, 1,041 households, and 767 families living in the township. The population density was 63.4 inhabitants per square mile (24.5/km^{2}). There were 1,258 housing units at an average density of 29.1 per square mile (11.2/km^{2}). The racial makeup of the township was 99.23% White, 0.04% African American, 0.04% Asian, 0.04% from other races, and 0.66% from two or more races. Hispanic or Latino of any race were 0.47% of the population.

There were 1,041 households, out of which 33.5% had children under the age of 18 living with them, 64.7% were married couples living together, 4.9% had a female householder with no husband present, and 26.3% were non-families. 22.5% of all households were made up of individuals, and 10.9% had someone living alone who was 65 years of age or older. The average household size was 2.63 and the average family size was 3.10.

In the township the population was spread out, with 24.8% under the age of 18, 7.4% from 18 to 24, 28.4% from 25 to 44, 26.2% from 45 to 64, and 13.2% who were 65 years of age or older. The median age was 38 years. For every 100 females, there were 102.4 males. For every 100 females age 18 and over, there were 102.3 males.

The median income for a household in the township was $41,575, and the median income for a family was $48,850. Males had a median income of $35,995 versus $24,420 for females. The per capita income for the township was $19,694. The average housing cost is between $25,000 and $650,000. About 8.4% of families and 9.4% of the population were below the poverty line, including 11.1% of those under age 18 and 10.3% of those age 65 or over.

== Gallery ==
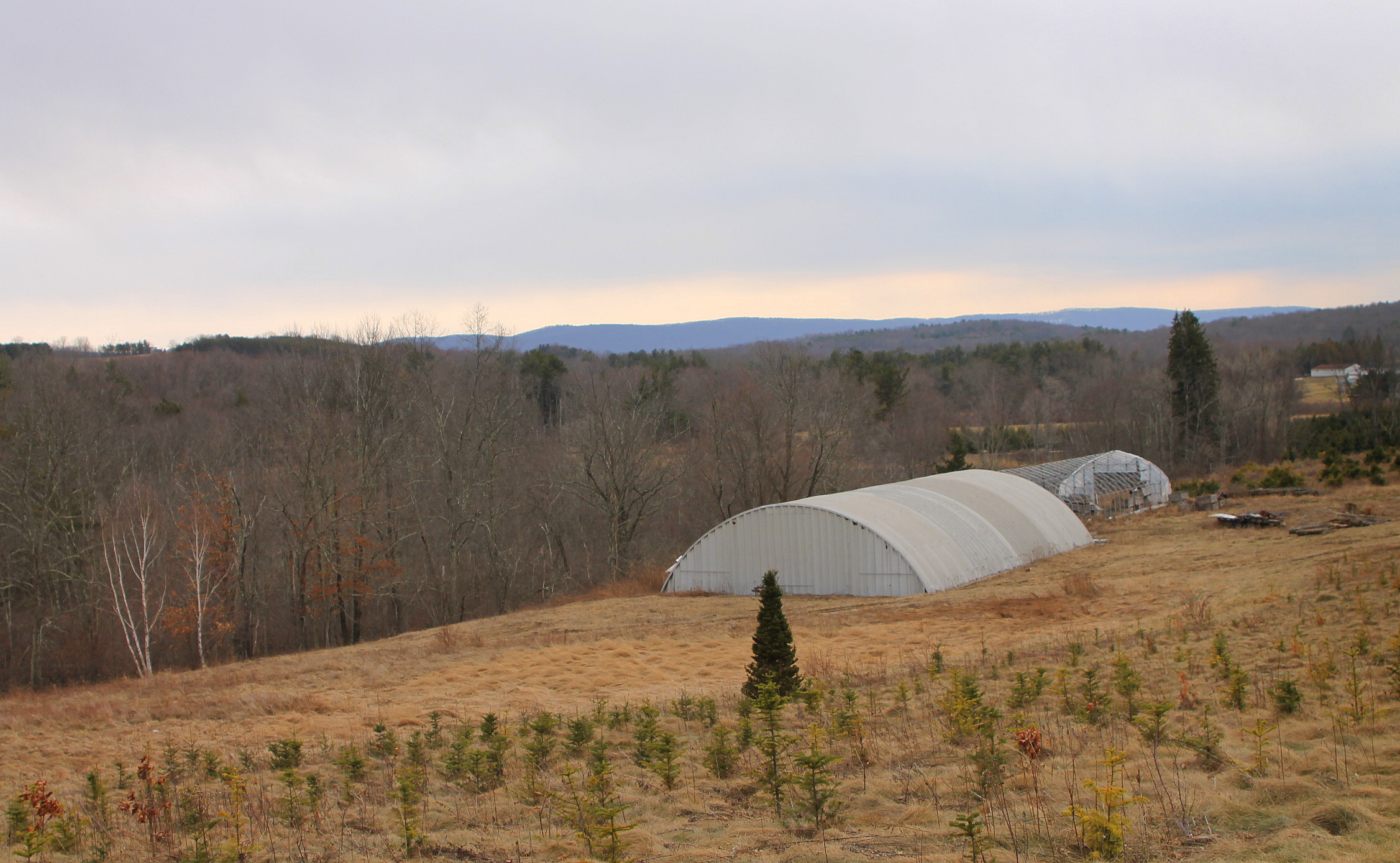
Ross Township from Twin Brooks Road

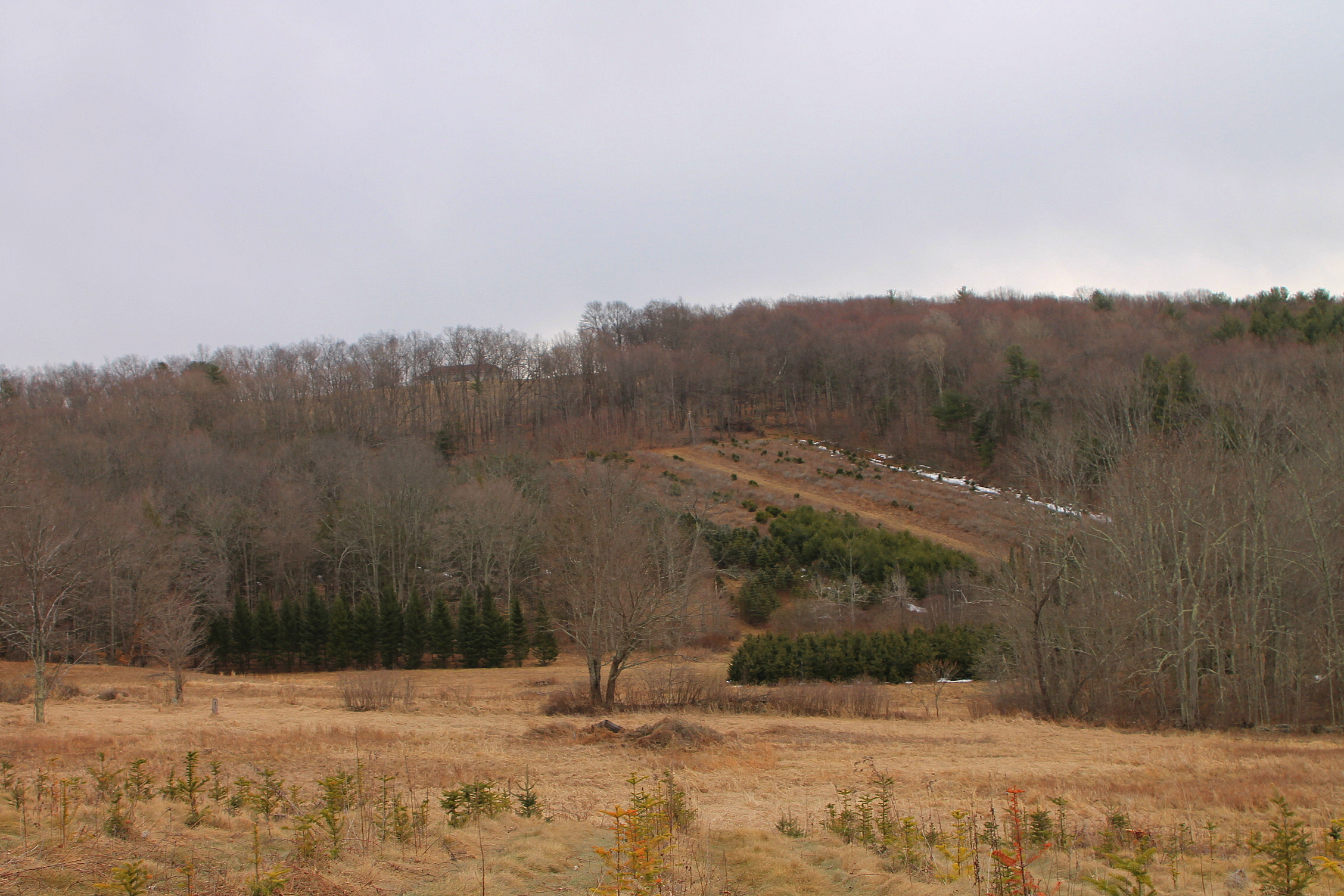
Ross Township from Twin Brooks Road

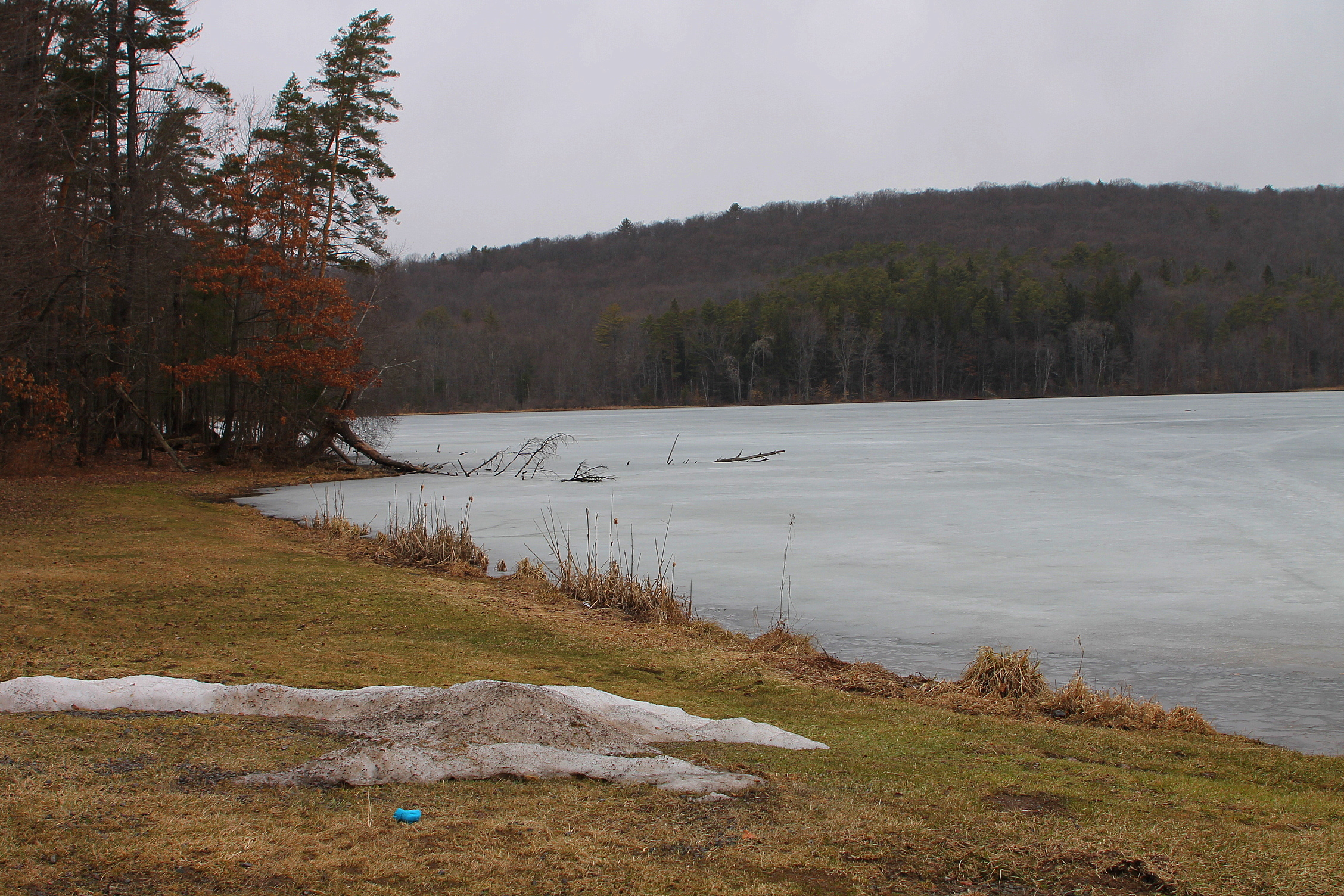
Harris Pond in Ross Township

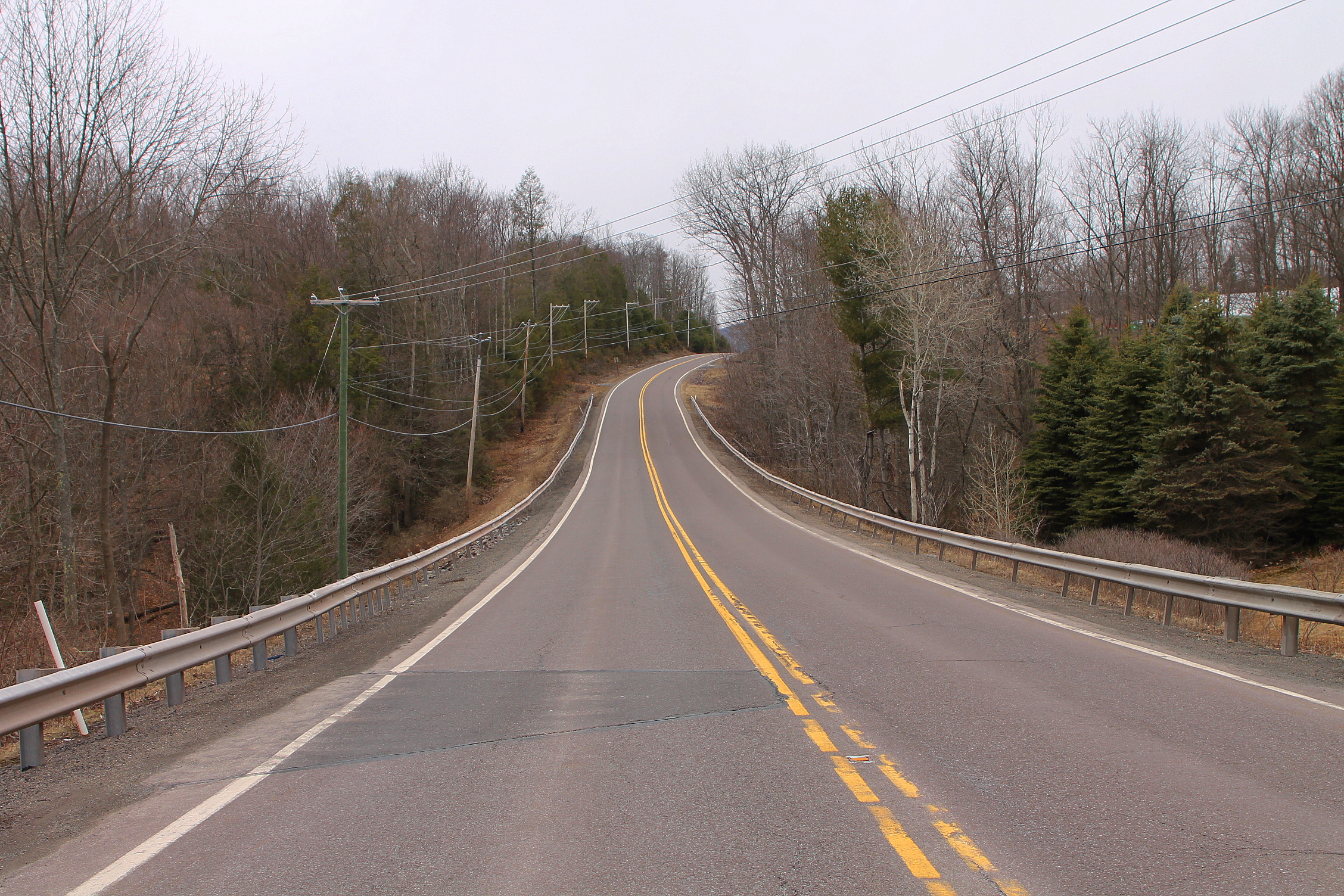
PA 118 in Ross Township

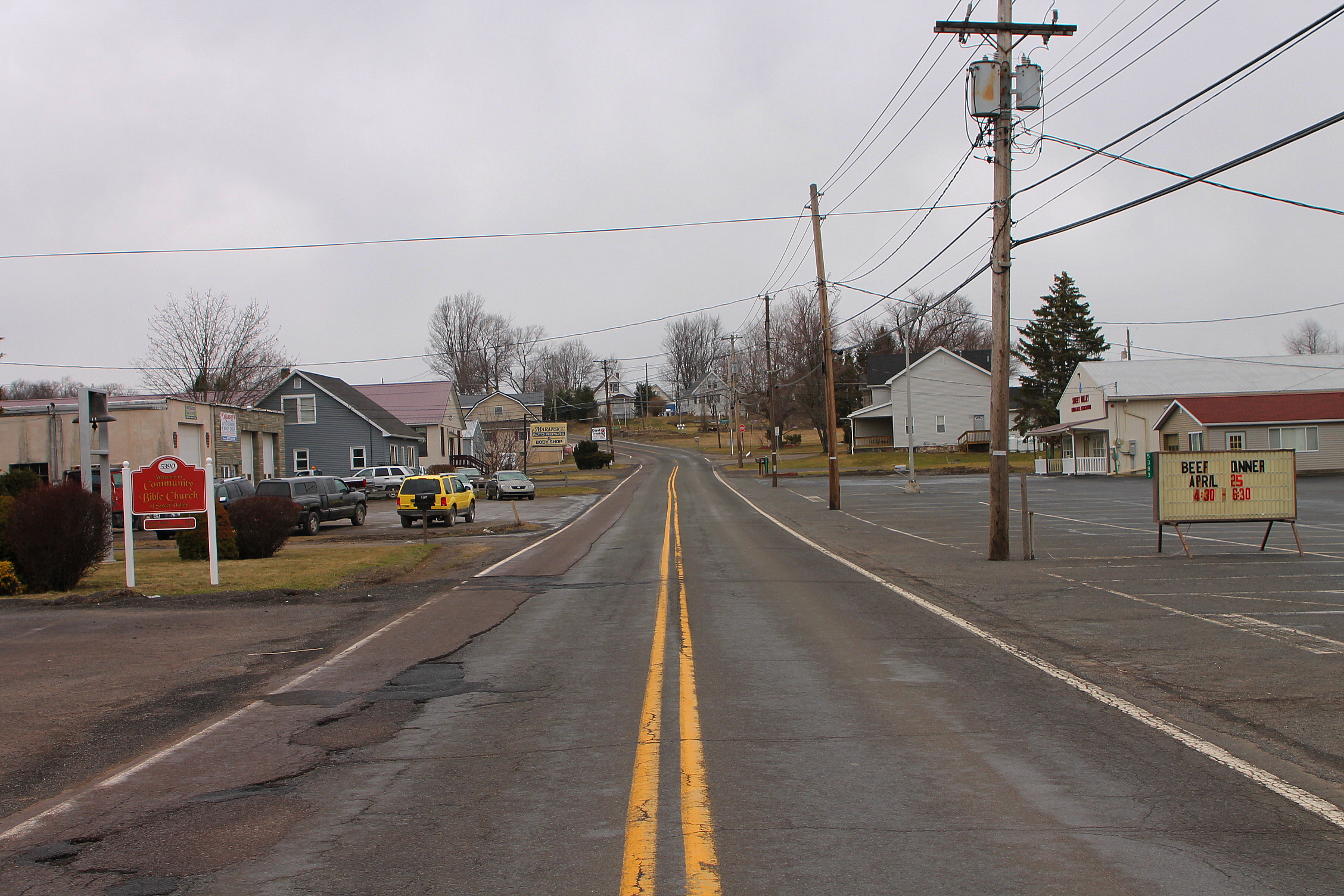
Main Road in Sweet Valley
