= Kitchen Creek (Pennsylvania) =

Creek in Luzerne County, Pennsylvania, U.S.

Coordinates: 41°13′46″N 76°14′09″W

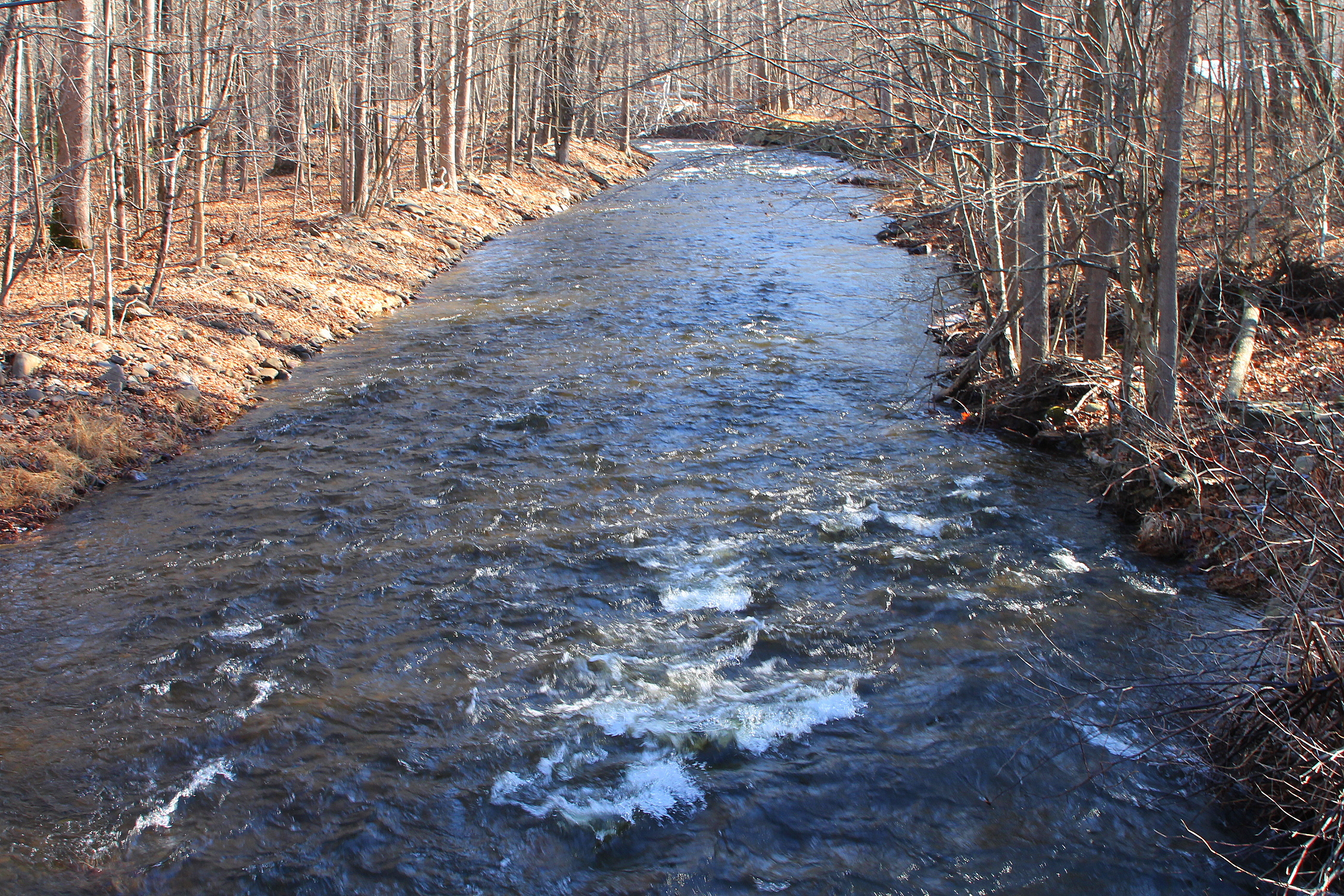
Kitchen Creek looking downstream

Kitchen Creek is a tributary of Huntington Creek in Luzerne County, Pennsylvania, in the United States. It is approximately 10.6 miles (17.1 km) long and flows through Fairmount Township and Huntington Township. The watershed of the creek has an area of 20.10 square miles (52.1 km^{2}). The creek is designated as a high-quality coldwater fishery.

== Course ==
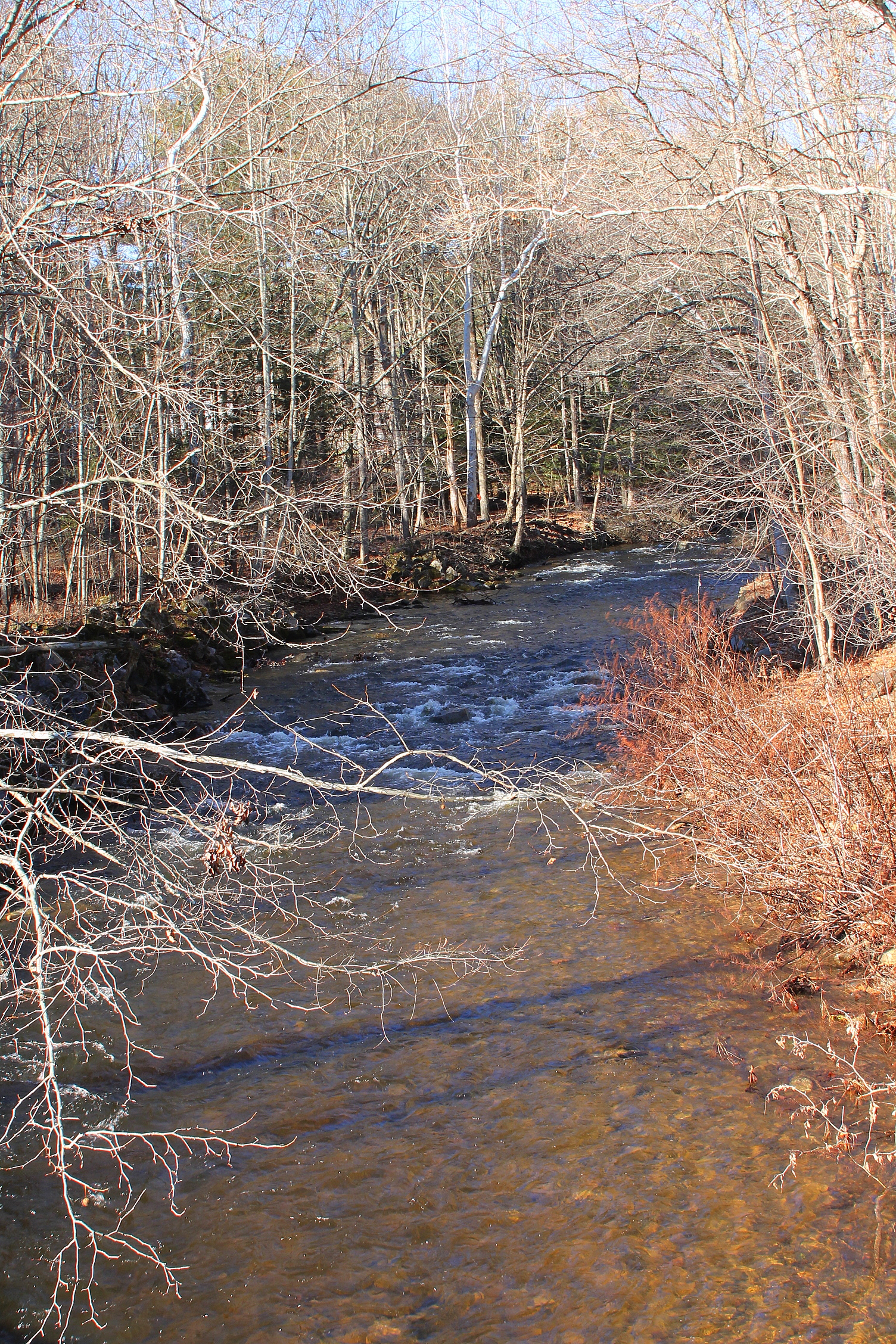
Kitchen Creek looking downstream

Kitchen Creek begins in Fairmount Township, near the border between Sullivan County and Luzerne County. The headwaters of the creek are also immediately south of Cherry Ridge. The creek flows southeast for some distance, passing through Lake Lehigh. It then turns south-southwest and enters a deep valley known as the Kitchen Creek Gorge, traveling over numerous waterfalls as it passes through Ricketts Glen State Park, where it receives the tributaries Shingle Cabin Brook and Maple Spring Brook. Upon leaving Ricketts Glen State Park, the creek turns south-southeast and receives the tributary Boston Run. Further downstream, it picks up the tributary Maple Run. After a while, the creek passes through Patterson Grove and enters Huntington Township, where it almost immediately reaches its confluence with Huntington Creek.

Kitchen Creek joins Huntington Creek 16.02 miles (25.78 km) upstream of its mouth.

== Geography, geology, and climate ==
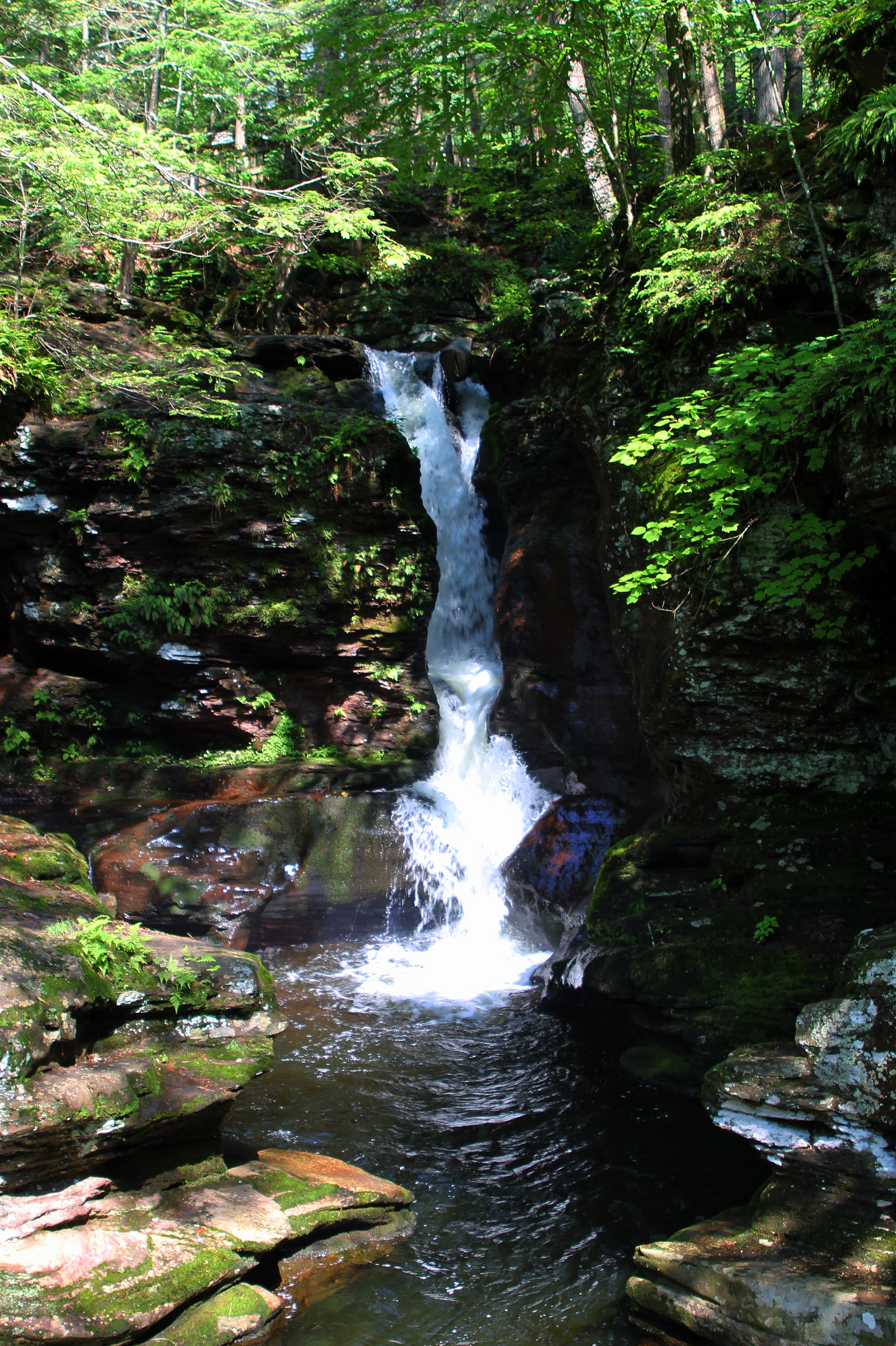
Adams Falls on Kitchen Creek, in Ricketts Glen State Park

The elevation near the mouth of Kitchen Creek is 797 feet (243 m) above sea level.

Lakes, swamps, and mountains are present at the headwaters of Kitchen Creek. The topography of the creek's watershed is described as "rough and hilly" in a 1921 book.

The channel of Kitchen Creek is sinuous. The creek flows through rock formations made of sandstone and shale. There is a gorge and waterfall system on the creek. This system is known as the Kitchen Creek Ravines. The Kitchen Creek Falls, a system of waterfalls and rapids, flows through Ricketts Glen State Park. This system has more than 25 waterfalls and descends 1,000 feet (300 m) in 3 miles (4.8 km).

The rate of precipitation in the watershed of Kitchen Creek ranges between 40 inches (100 cm) and 50 inches (130 cm) per year.

== Watershed ==
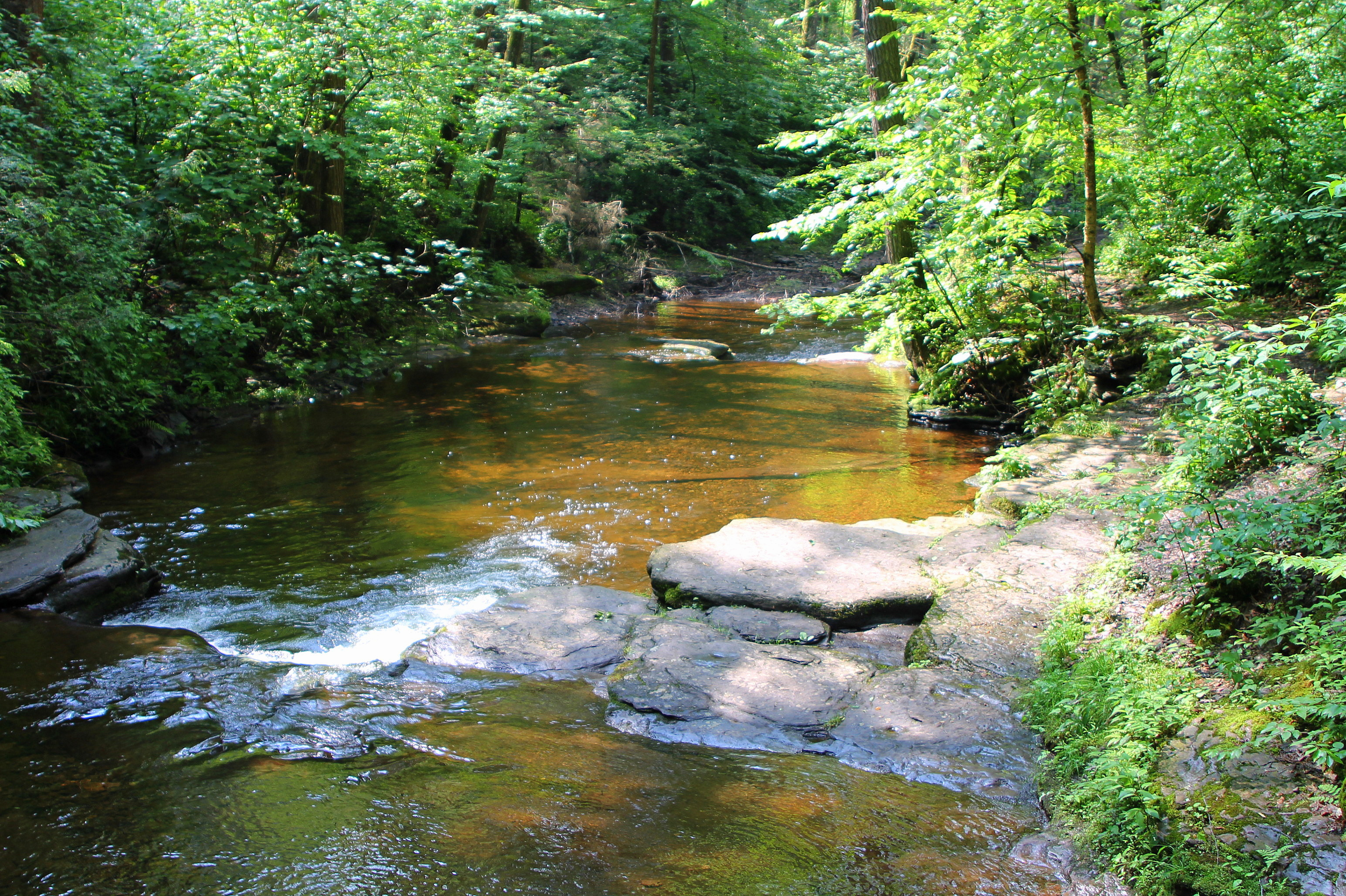
Kitchen Creek looking downstream in Ricketts Glen State Park, from the Evergreen Trail

The watershed (or drainage basin) of Kitchen Creek has an area of 20.10 square miles (52.1 km^{2}). The watershed is situated in southeastern Sullivan County and northwestern Luzerne County.

There are a number of lakes in the watershed of Kitchen Creek. The largest is Lake Jean, with a surface area of 296.0 acres and the second-largest is Lake Lehigh with a surface area of 137.0 acres. Ganoga Lake is the third-largest lake in the watershed, having a surface area of 78.8 acres. The watershed's fourth-largest lake is Lake Rose. It has a surface area of 47.0 acres.

In the early 1900s, the main industry in the watershed of Kitchen Creek was agriculture.

Communities in the watershed of Kitchen Creek include Red Rock. This community had a population of 27 in 1921.

== Biology ==
The creeping snowberry plant is present in the Kitchen Creek Ravines. Other plants in the ravines include Braun's holly fern, swamp currant, great-spurred violet, and white twisted-stalk

A bird species known as Swainson's thrush is found in the ravines of Kitchen Creek. The creek is designated as a high-quality coldwater fishery.

Virgin timber was present at the headwaters of Kitchen Creek as late as the early 1900s.

== See also ==
- List of rivers of Pennsylvania
- Pine Creek (Huntington Creek)
