= Class A Wild Trout Waters =

Class given to streams by the Pennsylvania Fish and Boat Commission

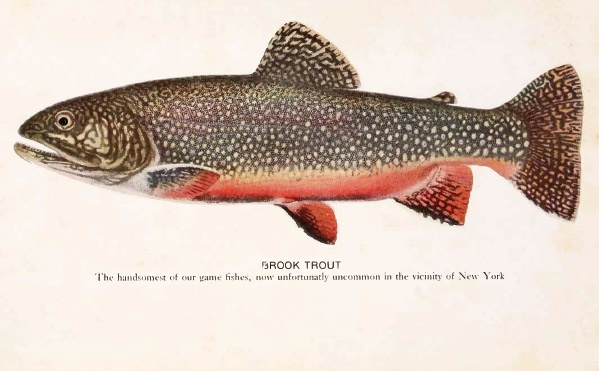
A brook trout, which occurs in many Class A Wild Trout Waters

Class A Wild Trout Waters are the highest biomass class given to streams in Pennsylvania by the Pennsylvania Fish and Boat Commission. They are considered to contain the highest-quality naturally reproducing trout populations in Pennsylvania. The first streams received their Class A Wild Trout Waters designations in 1983. There are now hundreds of such waters, comprising nearly 1,500 miles (2,400 km) of streams. Class A Wild Trout Waters receive certain legal protections. For instance, they are typically classified by the Pennsylvania Department of Environmental Protection as High-Quality Coldwater Fisheries. Most Class A Wild Trout Waters are subject to standard statewide angling regulations by the Pennsylvania Fish and Boat Commission.

The official definition of Class A Wild Trout Waters is "streams that support a population of naturally produced trout of sufficient size and abundance to support a long-term and rewarding sport fishery". These streams are considered to be the best angling streams in Pennsylvania and most of the state's 67 counties contain at least one. Class A Wild Trout Waters are virtually never stocked, although many were prior to receiving their designation. There are different total biomass criteria for different species and combinations of species, but for brook trout alone, the minimum is 30 kilograms per hectare (27 lb/acre), and for brown trout alone, the minimum is 40 kilograms per hectare (36 lb/acre).

== History ==
The modern stream classification system of the Pennsylvania Fish and Boat Commission, including Class A Wild Trout Waters, was developed with Operation Future, which marked a transition from recreation-based management to resource-based management, in 1983. Following statewide stream surveys in the late 1970s and early 1980s, the Pennsylvania Fish and Boat Commission created a set of biomass standards for trout streams in the state.

The first streams were designated as Class A Wild Trout Waters in 1983. At that time, 138 stream sections, totaling nearly 400 miles (640 km) of streams, were found to meet the criteria. As more streams were assessed, the number of Class A Wild Trout Waters grew rapidly. By 2005, there were 436 Class A Wild Trout Waters, totaling 1,265 miles (2,036 km). By the end of 2008, there were 487 such stream sections, which together included 1,436 miles (2,311 km) of streams. By 2014, there were 510 Class A Wild Trout Waters, comprising 1,490.6 miles (2,398.9 km) of streams.

In the 2010s, the fact that the Pennsylvania Fish and Boat Commission was considering adding seven urban streams to its list of Class A Wild Trout Waters—thus ending stocking there—caused some criticism by anglers who believed that this would impact the quality of fishing in heavily fished streams such as Monocacy Creek and Little Lehigh Creek. However, the criticism was not universal, with proponents pointing out that a redesignation would provide extra protection for the streams. The Pennsylvania Fish and Boat Commission eventually decided to classify them as Class A Wild Trout Waters, but continued stocking them in the spring to satisfy angler demand.

According to Pennsylvania Outdoor News Person of the Year Bill Anderson, the Pennsylvania Fish and Boat Commission has become hesitant to classify streams as Class A Wild Trout Waters due to "'social' concerns".

== Description and distribution ==
The official definition of Class A Wild Trout Waters is "streams that support a population of naturally produced trout of sufficient size and abundance to support a long-term and rewarding sport fishery".

Class A Wild Trout Waters are the "best of the best" streams for trout fishing in Pennsylvania. They are distributed widely across the state. However, most are found in north-central and Northeastern Pennsylvania, while very few are in the western third of the state. Some Class A Wild Trout Waters are located in the Pocono Mountains or the Lehigh Valley in eastern Pennsylvania. As of 2009, 49 of the state's 67 counties contain at least one Class A Wild Trout stream. However, in that year, only nine counties contained at least 30 miles (48 km) of Class A Wild Trout Waters.

Class A Wild Trout Waters are virtually never stocked with trout since they are managed solely for the propagation of wild trout. However, most current Class A Wild Trout streams were historically stocked with trout prior to the introduction of the Pennsylvania Fish and Boat Commission's classification system. They may also be tributaries of streams that are stocked with trout.

In 2014, there were 274 Class A Wild Trout Waters for brook trout, comprising 743.6 miles (1,196.7 km) of streams. There were 163 such stream segments for brown trout, making up a total of 507.3 miles (816.4 km) of streams, and 62 Class A Wild Trout Waters for both brook trout and brown trout, totaling 211.0 miles (339.6 km). There were only 11 Class A Wild Trout Waters for rainbow trout, making up 28.7 miles (46.2 km) of streams.

== Criteria ==
In order to be listed as Class A Wild Trout Waters, a stream must be surveyed by Pennsylvania Fish and Boat Commission biologists with "approved protocols" to determine that it meets the relevant standards. The official designation is carried out by the Board of Commissioners.

The criteria for Class A Wild Trout Waters vary by species. For brook trout, a biomass of 30 kilograms per hectare (27 lb/acre), including at least 0.1 kilograms per hectare (0.089 lb/acre) of brook trout less than 15 centimeters (5.9 in) long. Additionally, brook trout may not make up less than 75 percent of the total wild trout biomass. The requirements are the same for brown trout except that the minimum brown trout biomass is 40 kilograms per hectare (36 lb/acre).

For a stream to be Class A Wild Trout Waters for both brook trout and brown trout, the combined biomass of both species must be at least 40 kilograms per hectare (36 lb/acre) and the biomass of each species must include at least 0.1 kilograms per hectare (0.089 lb/acre) of trout less than 15 centimeters (5.9 in) long. Neither species may make up more than 75 percent of the total wild trout biomass.

The criteria for rainbow trout are considerably simpler: the only requirement is that the biomass of wild rainbow trout less than 15 centimeters (5.9 in) long must be at least 2 kilograms per hectare (1.8 lb/acre). There is only one stream in Pennsylvania that is Class A Wild Trout Waters for brook trout and rainbow trout: Roaring Run.

There are several rankings with lower biomass requirements in the Pennsylvania Fish and Boat Commission's classification system: Class B Wild Trout Waters, Class C Wild Trout Waters, Class D Wild Trout Waters, and Class E Wild Trout Waters.

== Legal significance ==
The Pennsylvania Department of Environmental Protection designates Class A Wild Trout Waters as High-Quality Coldwater Fisheries, provided that there has been an adequate period of public comment and participation. This provides such streams with extra legal protections under the federal Clean Water Act. Thus, any activity involving discharges into a Class A Wild Trout Stream is required to comply with more restrictive standards than for other streams. Some streams receive Exceptional Value status due to their classification as Class A Wild Trout Waters.

Under Section 57.8a of the Pennsylvania Code, the Pennsylvania Fish and Boat Commission is to manage trout populations in Class A Wild Trout Waters as renewable natural resources, and to conserve the populations for anglers.

The Susquehanna River Basin Commission bases its water withdrawal policy in part on the Pennsylvania Fish and Boat Commission's biomass classifications system. The habitat loss criteria for Class A Wild Trout Waters is 5 percent, except in cases of social or economic justification, in which case it is 7.5 percent.

Class A Wild Trout Waters are subject to several angling regulations. The vast majority (92 percent) of such steams are managed with the statewide minimum length of 7 inches (18 cm) and the maximum creel limit of five fish. Of the 40+ Class A Wild Trout Waters under special regulations, about half are managed with a Catch and Release regulation. Trophy Trout and Wild Brook Trout Enhancement regulations apply to the remainder. A total of 31 Class A Wild Trout Waters have been designated as Wilderness Trout Streams.

Fishing in Class A Wild Trout Waters is permitted year-round, although the killing of fish is forbidden from Labor Day to the beginning of the following year's trout season.

== Gallery ==
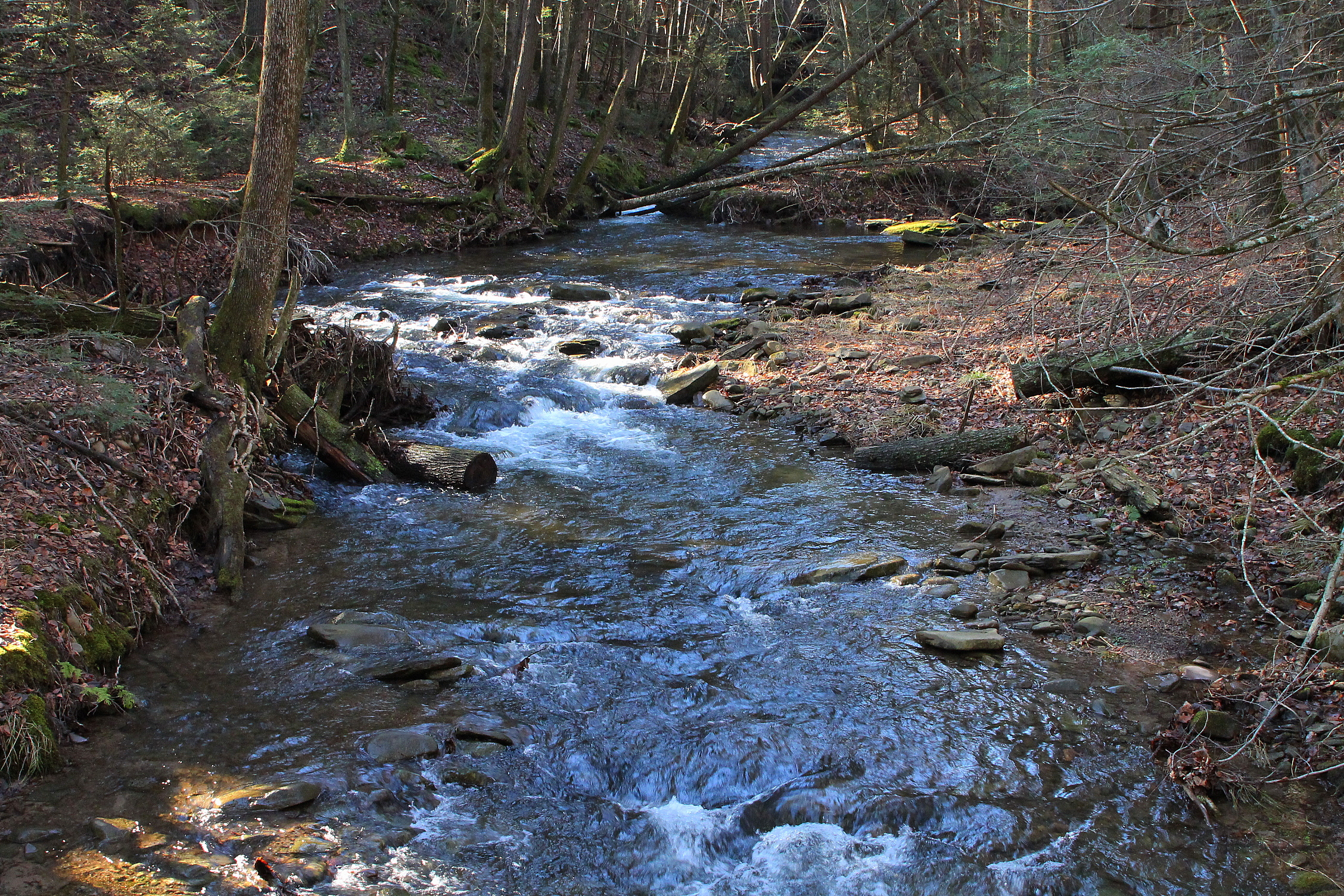
Arnold Creek

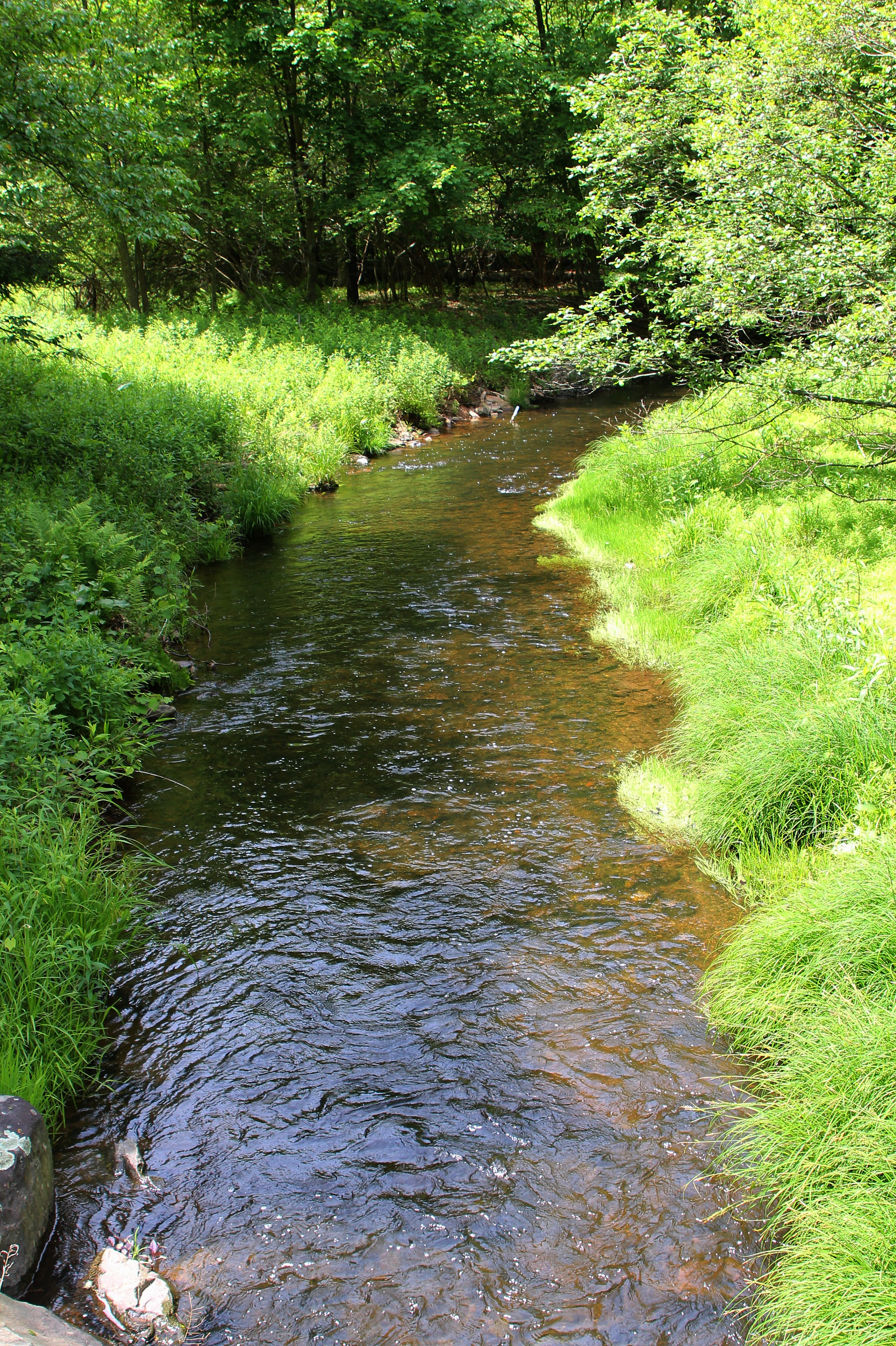
Balliet Run

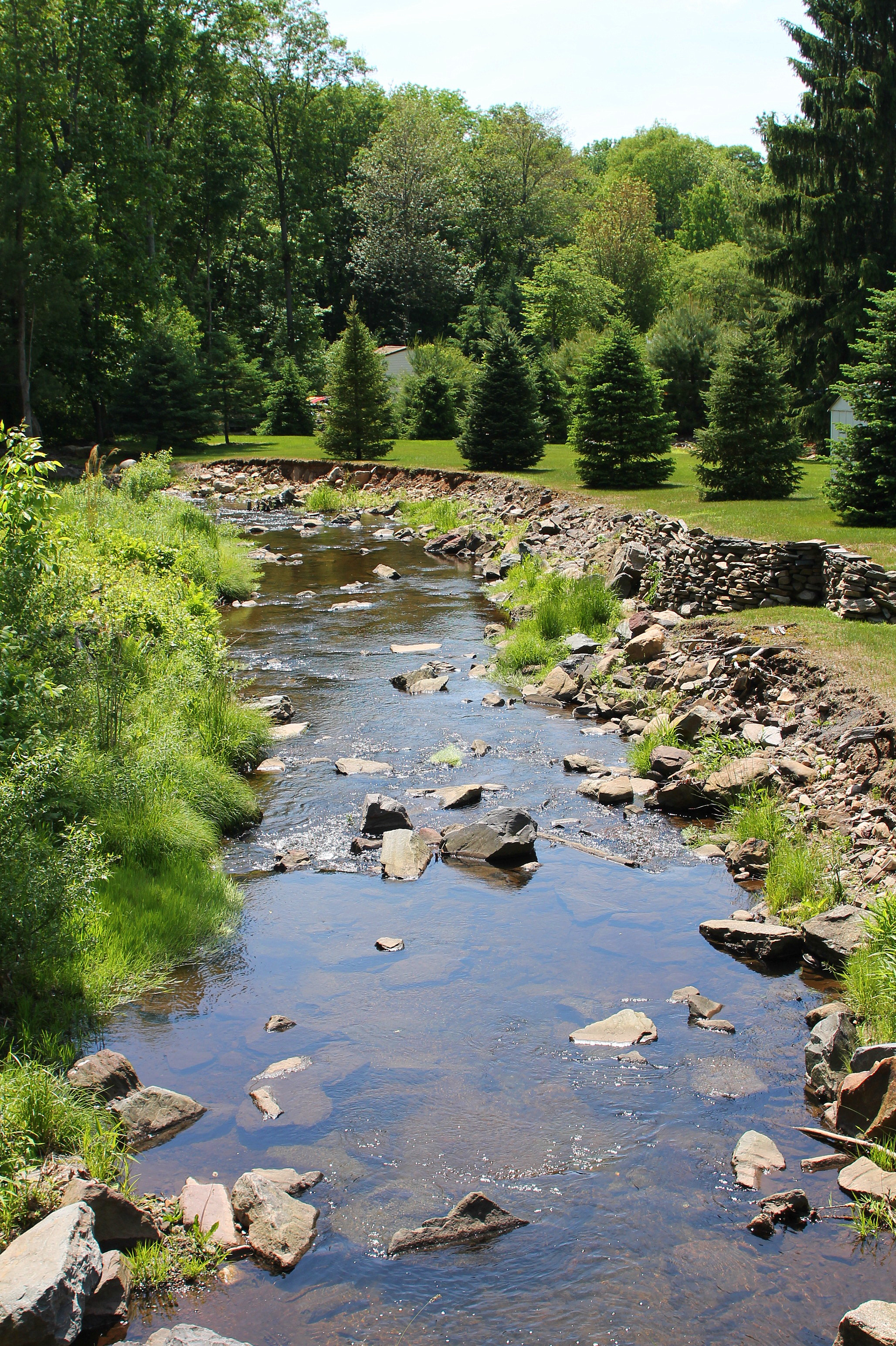
Bow Creek

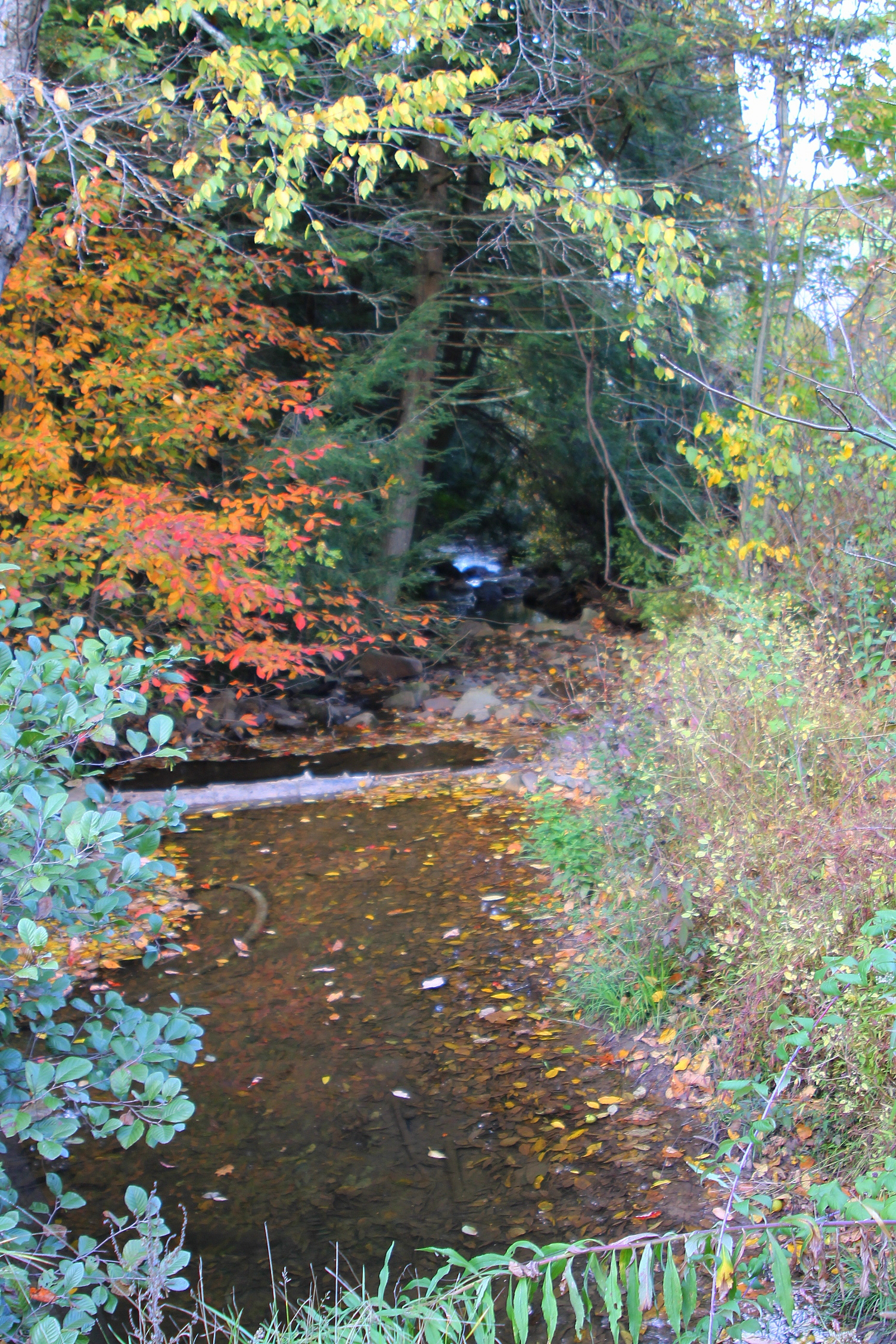
Klingermans Run

== See also ==
- Blue Ribbon fishery
