= Marsh Run =

Stream in Pennsylvania, United States

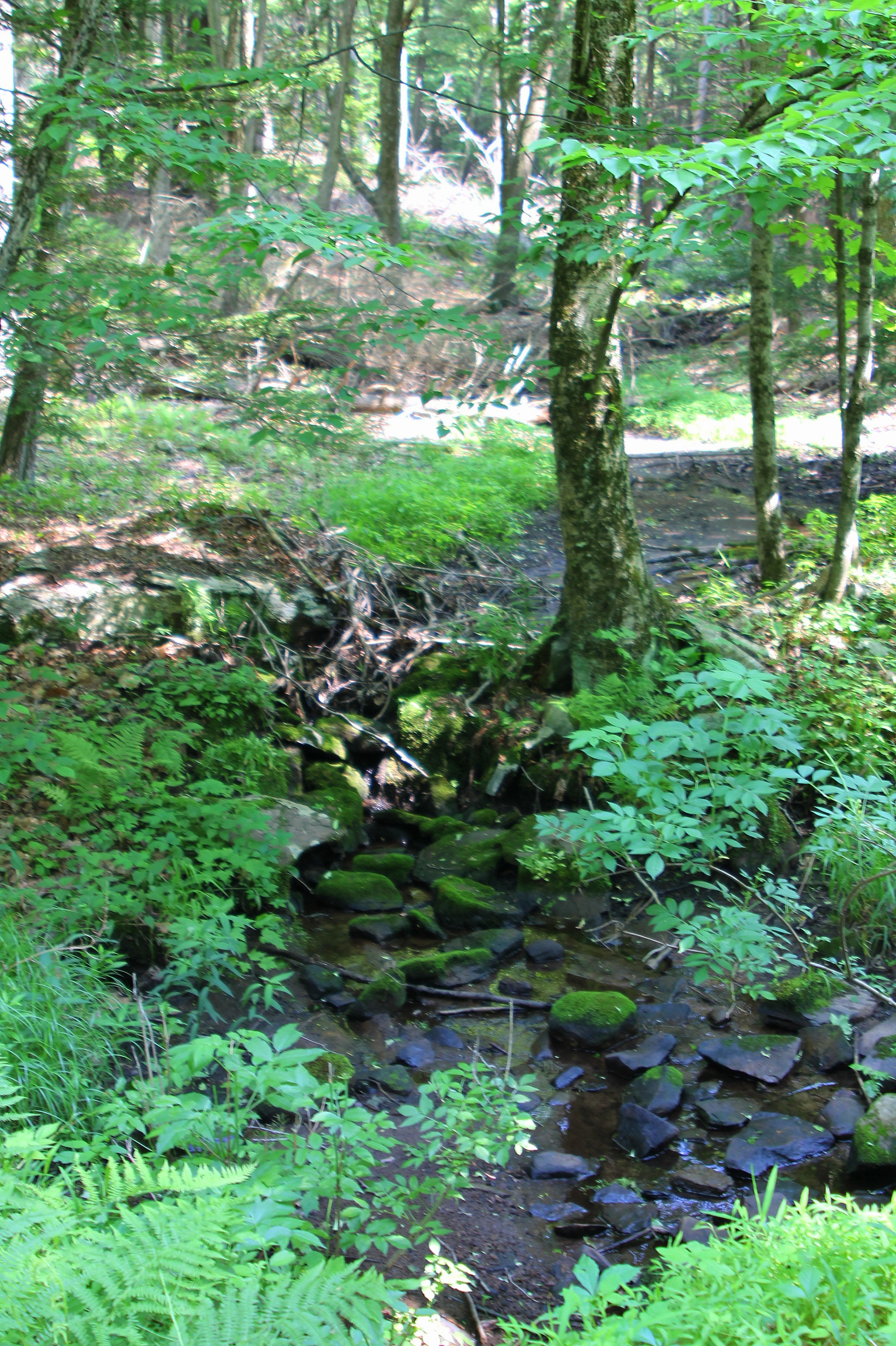
- Marsh Run looking upstream at the Columbia County/Luzerne County line

Physical characteristics
- Source
  - location: small pond in western Fairmount Township, Luzerne County, Pennsylvania
  - elevation: between 1,220 and 1,240 feet (370 and 380 m)
- Mouth
  - location: Coles Creek in northeastern Sugarloaf Township, Columbia County, Pennsylvania
  - coordinates: 41°17′03″N 76°19′21″W
  - elevation: 1,115 ft (340 m)
- Length: 1.0 mi (1.6 km)
- Basin size: 0.44 sq mi (1.1 km^{2})

Basin features
- Progression: Coles Creek → Fishing Creek → Susquehanna River → Chesapeake Bay
- Tributaries
  - right: one unnamed tributary

Marsh Run is a tributary of Coles Creek in Luzerne County and Columbia County, in Pennsylvania, in the United States. It is approximately one mile (1.6 km) long and flows through Fairmount Township in Luzerne County and Sugarloaf Township in Columbia County. The stream's watershed has an area of 0.44 square miles (1.1 km^{2}). Wild trout reproduce throughout the stream. It is named after marshes, which can be found in the vicinity of the stream. Alluvium and Wisconsinian Outwash area also present, as is bedrock consisting of sandstone and shale. The stream has one unnamed tributary.

== Course ==
Marsh Run begins in a small pond in western Fairmount Township, Luzerne County. It flows west for several tenths of a mile, passing through a wetland and crossing Hynick Road. Almost immediately after crossing Hynick Road, the stream exits Luzerne County. Upon exiting Luzerne County, it enters Sugarloaf Township, Columbia County. The stream continues flowing west, receiving an unnamed tributary from the right after a short distance. A short distance further downstream, it reaches its confluence with Coles Creek.

Marsh Run joins Coles Creek 4.48 miles (7.21 km) upstream of its mouth.

== Geography and geology ==
The elevation near the mouth of Marsh Run is 1,115 feet (340 m) above sea level. The elevation of the stream's source is between 1,220 and 1,240 feet (370 and 380 m) above sea level. The stream is relatively small and has marshes along it.

For most of its length, Marsh Run flows over a glacial till known as the Wisconsinian Till. Most of the till in the vicinity of the stream is expected to be more than 6 feet (1.8 m) thick. However, the stream's lower reaches are on alluvium and Wisconsinan Outwash. The former contains stratified sand, silt, and gravel, while the latter contains stratified sand and gravel. Bedrock consisting of sandstone and shale is also present in the vicinity of the stream. A wetland is located in its upper reaches.

== Watershed and biology ==
The watershed of Marsh Run has an area of 0.44 square miles (1.1 km^{2}). The stream is entirely in the United States Geological Survey quadrangle of Red Rock. It is located in the northeastern portion of Sugarloaf Township.

Wild trout naturally reproduce in Marsh Run throughout between its headwaters and its mouth.

== History and etymology ==
Marsh Run was entered into the Geographic Names Information System on August 2, 1979. Its identifier in the Geographic Names Information System is 1180455.

Marsh Run is named for the fact that marshes are located along it.

== See also ==
- Chimneystack Run, next tributary of Coles Creek going upstream
- Ashelman Run, next tributary of Coles Creek going downstream
- List of tributaries of Fishing Creek (North Branch Susquehanna River)
