= Peterman Run =

Physical characteristics
- Source
  - location: plateau in Davidson Township, Sullivan County, Pennsylvania
  - elevation: between 2,240 and 2,260 feet (680 and 690 m)
- Mouth
  - location: West Branch Fishing Creek in Sugarloaf Township, Columbia County, Pennsylvania
  - coordinates: 41°18′14″N 76°23′36″W
  - elevation: 1,115 ft (340 m)
- Length: 1.7 mi (2.7 km)
- Basin size: 0.41 mi^{2} (1.1 km^{2})

Basin features
- Progression: West Branch Fishing Creek → Fishing Creek → Susquehanna River → Chesapeake Bay

Peterman Run is a tributary of West Branch Fishing Creek in Sullivan County and Columbia County, in Pennsylvania, in the United States. It is approximately 1.7 miles (2.7 km) long and flows through Davidson Township in Sullivan County and Sugarloaf Township in Columbia County. The watershed of the stream has an area of 0.41 square miles (1.1 km^{2}). Glacial till and bedrock consisting of shale and sandstone can be found along the stream. It is considered to be impaired by atmospheric deposition and metals.

== Course ==
Peterman Run begins on a plateau in Davidson Township, Sullivan County. It flows south-southwest for a few tenths of a mile before leaving the plateau and flowing down its side, descending steeply. The stream continues flowing south-southwest. After several tenths of a mile, it exits Sullivan County.

Upon exiting Sullivan County, Peterman Run enters Sugarloaf Township, Columbia County. It turns south for a short distance before reaching the bottom of the slope and turning east. After several hundred feet, the stream turns south-southeast. After approximately a thousand feet (three hundred meters), it reaches its confluence with West Branch Fishing Creek.

Peterman Run joins West Branch Fishing Creek 2.88 miles (4.63 km) upstream of its mouth, only 0.06 miles (0.097 km) upstream of the mouth of Rough Run.

== Hydrology, geography, and geology ==
A total of 1.63 miles (2.62 km) of Peterman Run is considered to be impaired due to atmospheric deposition and metals. The impaired waters of the stream comprise approximately 4.01 percent of the total impaired waters in Sullivan County within the watersheds of West Branch Fishing Creek and East Branch Fishing Creek.

The elevation near the mouth of Peterman Run is 1,115 feet (340 m) above sea level. The elevation of the stream's source is between 2,240 and 2,260 feet (680 and 690 m) above sea level.

A significant portion of the lower reaches of Peterman Run is on a glacial till known as the Wisconsinan Bouldery Till. The surface is largely covered with boulders and it is a diamict. The Wisconsinan Bouldery Till is typically at least 6 feet (1.8 m) thick. Alluvial terrace also occurs near the stream's lower reaches, in the valley of West Branch Fishing Creek. The Wisconsinan Till occurs near the stream's headwaters and is typically more than 6 feet (1.8 m) thick. Bedrock consisting of sandstone and shale can be found in the stream's middle reaches.

== Watershed ==
The watershed of Peterman Run has an area of 0.41 square miles (1.1 km^{2}). The stream is entirely within the United States Geological Survey quadrangle of Elk Grove. The stream's watershed is part of the Upper Susquehanna-Lackawanna drainage basin.

Peterman Run is in the vicinity of Pennsylvania State Game Lands Number 13.

== History ==
Peterman Run was entered into the Geographic Names Information System on August 2, 1979. Its identifier in the Geographic Names Information System is 1183619.

Peterman Run was listed as impaired in both 2002 and 2004.

== See also ==
- Rough Run, next tributary of West Branch Fishing Creek going downstream
- List of tributaries of Fishing Creek (North Branch Susquehanna River)
