= York Hollow =

York Hollow Yorks Hollow, York's Hollow

Physical characteristics
- Source
  - location: small pond in the community of Divide in Jackson Township, Columbia County, Pennsylvania
  - elevation: between 1,180 and 1,200 feet (360 and 370 m)
- Mouth
  - location: West Creek in Sugarloaf Township, Columbia County, Pennsylvania
  - coordinates: 41°14′14″N 76°23′53″W
  - elevation: 863 ft (263 m)
- Length: 2.5 mi (4.0 km)
- Basin size: 1.47 sq mi (3.8 km^{2})

Basin features
- Progression: West Creek → Fishing Creek → Chesapeake Bay
- Tributaries
  - left: Schultz Hollow
  - right: one unnamed tributary

York Hollow (also known as Yorks Hollow or York's Hollow) is a tributary of West Creek in Columbia County, Pennsylvania, in the United States. It is approximately 2.5 miles (4.0 km) long and flows through Jackson Township and Sugarloaf Township. The watershed of the stream has an area of 1.47 square miles (3.8 km^{2}). Wild trout naturally reproduce in the stream. The surficial geology in the area mainly consists of Illinoian Till, Illinoian Lag, alluvium, colluvium, and bedrock.

== Course ==
York Hollow begins in a small pond in the community of Divide, in Jackson Township. It flows southeast for more than a mile alongside Pennsylvania Route 239 before crossing the highway and turning east. It then receives the tributary Schultz Hollow from the left and turns southeast for several tenths of a mile, entering Sugarloaf Township. The stream then receives an unnamed tributary from the right. A few tenths of a mile further downstream, it reaches its confluence with West Creek.

York Hollow joins West Creek 4.34 miles (6.98 km) upstream of its mouth.

=== Tributaries ===
York Hollow has one named tributary, which is known as Schultz Hollow. Schultz Hollow joins York Hollow 0.96 miles (1.54 km) upstream of its mouth. Its watershed has an area of 0.43 square miles (1.1 km^{2}).

== Geography ==
The elevation near the mouth of York Hollow is 863 feet (263 m) above sea level. The elevation of the stream's source is between 1,180 and 1,200 feet (360 and 370 m) above sea level.

The surficial geology in the vicinity of York Hollow mainly consists of alluvium and colluvium. However, there is also Illinoian Till and Illinoian Lag present, as well as bedrock. The surficial geology at its headwaters mainly consists of Illinoian Lag.

== Watershed ==
The watershed of York Hollow has an area of 1.47 square miles (3.8 km^{2}). The stream's mouth is in the United States Geological Survey quadrangle of Benton. However, its source is in the quadrangle of Elk Grove.

York Hollow is located to the southeast of the community of Divide.

== History and etymology ==
York Hollow was entered into the Geographic Names Information System on August 2, 1979. Its identifier in the Geographic Names Information System is 1191899.

York Hollow is named after the valley through which it flows. The valley is in turn named after John Lundy Yorks, Leo Yorks, and Stanley Yorks, who were farmers and landowners in the area.

== Biology ==
Wild trout naturally reproduce in York Hollow from its headwaters downstream to its mouth.

== See also ==
- Spencer Run, next tributary of West Creek going downstream
- List of tributaries of Fishing Creek (North Branch Susquehanna River)
- List of rivers of Pennsylvania
