= Hess Hollow =

- Etymology: named after the landowner William Hess

Physical characteristics
- Source
  - location: unnamed pond in Sugarloaf Township, Columbia County, Pennsylvania
  - elevation: 1,240 ft (380 m)
- Mouth
  - location: Coles Creek in Sugarloaf Township, Columbia County, Pennsylvania
  - coordinates: 41°15′33″N 76°20′51″W
  - elevation: 951 ft (290 m)
- Length: 1.8 mi (2.9 km)
- Basin size: 1.25 mi^{2} (3.2 km^{2})

Basin features
- Progression: Coles Creek → Fishing Creek → Susquehanna River → Chesapeake Bay

Hess Hollow is an unofficially named tributary of Coles Creek in Columbia County, Pennsylvania, in the United States. It is approximately 1.8 miles (2.9 km) long and flows through Sugarloaf Township. The watershed of the stream has an area of 1.25 square miles (3.2 km^{2}). Hess Hollow is listed on the Columbia County Natural Areas Inventory as a "Locally Significant Area". The stream is also Class A Wild Trout Waters.

== Course ==
Hess Hollow begins in a pond in Sugarloaf Township, just south of Central Mountain. It flows south for some distance, crossing Pennsylvania Route 118 and entering a valley. After more than a mile, the stream turns southwest and then abruptly turns southeast, crossing Pennsylvania Route 487. Almost immediately afterwards, it reaches its confluence with Coles Creek.

Hess Hollow joins Coles Creek 2.06 miles (3.32 km) upstream of its mouth.

== Geography, hydrology and watershed ==
The elevation near the mouth of Hess Hollow is 951 feet (290 m) above sea level. The elevation of the stream's source is just over 1,240 feet (380 m) above sea level.

Hess Hollow does some meandering. Fritz Hill is situated to the west of the hollow. There is a pond at the headwaters of the stream, but it is unnamed.

The total concentration of alkalinity in the waters of Hess Hollow is 12 milligrams per liter.

The watershed of Hess Hollow has an area of 1.25 square miles (3.2 km^{2}). The area in the vicinity of the stream mainly consists of forested wetlands and open graminoid marshes. The stream has a fairly sizable riparian buffer around it. However, some selective cutting and agricultural activity is done in the watershed. The stream flows entirely through closed, private land.

The Columbia County Natural Areas Inventory recommends selective cutting and increased deer hunting in the vicinity of Hess Hollow. The inventory also recommends conserving the stream's riparian buffer.

== History and etymology ==
Hess Hollow is most likely named after William Hess. Hess was a landowner with property in the vicinity of the hollow during the 1800s.

== Plants ==
Hess Hollow is listed as a "locally significant site" on the Columbia County Natural Areas Inventory.

Numerous tree species inhabit the forests in the vicinity of Hess Hollow. These include red oak, red maple, sugar maple, white pine, yellow birch, black birch, and Eastern hemlock. Trees such as sassafras and striped maple grow in the wetlands of the hollow.

A large number of plants other than trees inhabit the wetlands of Hess Hollow. These include many species of sedges and ferns, and also buttercups, club mosses, false hellebores, Indian cucumbers, huckleberries, jewelweed, raspberries, sphagnum moss, trillium, wood nettles, and numerous others.

== Animals ==
Several bird species have been observed in Hess Hollow. These include two warblers, the black-capped chickadee, the blue-headed vireo, the common yellowthroat, the ovenbird, the veery, and the wood thrush. Additionally, chipmunks and red-spotted newts inhabit the stream's watershed. Hess Hollow experiences overgrazing by deer.

The entire drainage basin of Hess Hollow is designated as a coldwater fishery, but is used as a high-quality coldwater fishery. It is also designated as Class A Wild Trout Waters. Brook trout inhabit Hess Hollow throughout its length. Trout also reproduce naturally throughout the length of the stream.

== See also ==
- Fallow Hollow
- List of tributaries of Fishing Creek (North Branch Susquehanna River)
