= Rough Run =

- Etymology: named for the speed of its waters and the dense foliage surrounding it

Physical characteristics
- Source
  - location: plateau in Davidson Township, Sullivan County, Pennsylvania
  - elevation: between 2,240 and 2,260 feet (680 and 690 m)
- Mouth
  - location: West Branch Fishing Creek in Sugarloaf Township, Columbia County, Pennsylvania
  - coordinates: 41°18′14″N 76°23′32″W
  - elevation: 1,142 ft (348 m)
- Length: 1.3 mi (2.1 km)
- Basin size: 0.72 mi^{2} (1.9 km^{2})

Basin features
- Progression: West Branch Fishing Creek → Fishing Creek → Susquehanna River → Chesapeake Bay

Rough Run is a tributary of West Branch Fishing Creek in Sullivan County and Columbia County, in Pennsylvania, in the United States. It is approximately 1.3 miles (2.1 km) long and flows through Davidson Township in Sullivan County and Sugarloaf Township in Columbia County. The watershed of the stream has an area of 0.72 square miles (1.9 km^{2}). Glacial till and bedrock consisting of shale and sandstone can be found along the stream. It is named for the speed of its waters and the foliage along the sides of the stream.

== Course ==
Rough Run begins on a plateau in Davidson Township, Sullivan County, not far from the edge of the West Branch Fishing Creek watershed. The stream flows south-southwest for a short distance before turning south-southeast and dropping off the plateau. It begins to descend steeply in a valley. After a few tenths of a mile, the stream turns south-southwest again and exits Sullivan County after several tenths of a mile.

Upon exiting Sullivan County, Rough Run enters Sugarloaf Township, Columbia County. It continues flowing south-southwest and steeply descending. After several tenths of a mile, the stream turns southwest for several hundred feet. It then turns south-southeast for several hundred feet and reaches the slope. The stream reaches its confluence with West Branch Fishing Creek immediately afterwards.

Rough Run joins West Branch Fishing Creek 2.82 miles (4.54 km) upstream of its mouth, only 0.06 miles (0.097 km) downstream of the mouth of Peterman Run.

== Geography and geology ==
The elevation near the mouth of Rough Run is 1,142 feet (348 m) above sea level. The elevation of the stream's source is between 2,240 and 2,260 feet (680 and 690 m).

For most of its length, Rough Run is on a glacial till known as the Wisconsinan Bouldery Till. The surface is largely covered with boulders and it is a diamict. The Wisconsinan Boulder Till is typically at least 6 feet (1.8 m) thick. It is upper reaches, the stream flows over bedrock consisting of sandstone and shale. The sandstone and shale are interbedded and are red and gray in color. The bedrock's diamict is reddish-brown to yellowish-brown.

== Watershed ==
The watershed of Rough Run has an area of 0.72 square miles (1.9 km^{2}). The stream is entirely within the United States Geological Survey quadrangle of Elk Grove. Its mouth is in the northernmost part of Sugarloaf Township, Columbia County.

== History and etymology ==
Rough Run was entered into the Geographic Names Information System on August 2, 1979. Its identifier in the Geographic Names Information System is 1185512.

Rough Run is named for the rapid speed which its waters flow at and also for the dense foliage that occurs along it.

== See also ==
- List of tributaries of Fishing Creek (North Branch Susquehanna River)
