= Chimneystack Run =

Stream in Pennsylvania, United States

Chimneystack Run Chimney Stack Run

Physical characteristics
- Source
  - location: valley between Central Mountain and Red Rock Mountain in northern Sugarloaf Township, Columbia County, Pennsylvania
  - elevation: between 2,100 and 2,120 feet (640 and 650 m)
- Mouth
  - location: Coles Creek in Sugarloaf Township, Columbia County, Pennsylvania
  - coordinates: 41°17′12″N 76°19′15″W
  - elevation: 1,038 ft (316 m)
- Length: 1.8 mi (2.9 km)
- Basin size: 1.07 mi^{2} (2.8 km^{2})

Basin features
- Progression: Coles Creek → Fishing Creek → Susquehanna River → Chesapeake Bay
- Tributaries
  - left: one unnamed tributary

Chimneystack Run (also known as Chimney Stack Run) is a tributary of Coles Creek in Columbia County, Pennsylvania, in the United States. It is approximately 1.8 miles (2.9 km) long and flows through Sugarloaf Township. The watershed of the stream has an area of 1.07 square miles (2.8 km^{2}). The stream's headwaters are located between Red Rock Mountain and Central Mountain. It has no named tributaries, but one unnamed tributary. Chimneystack Run is named after Chimneystack Rock. Wild trout inhabit the stream. Glaciation has affected the geography and geology in its vicinity.

== Course ==
Chimneystack Run begins in a deep valley between Central Mountain and Red Rock Mountain in northern Sugarloaf Township, slightly more than 1,000 feet (300 m) south of the Columbia County/Sullivan County line. It flows east-southeast for a few tenths of a mile and its valley deepens. The stream then turns south for a similar distance before turning east-southeast. Its valley becomes significantly shallower at this point. After a few tenths of a mile, it leaves its valley altogether, turning south-southeast and flowing down Central Mountain. After several tenths of a mile, the stream receives an unnamed tributary from the left. A short distance later, it reaches its confluence with Coles Creek.

Chimneystack Run joins Coles Creek 4.70 miles (7.56 km) upstream of its mouth.

== Geography and geology ==
The elevation near the mouth of Chimneystack Run is 1,038 feet (316 m) above sea level. The elevation of the stream's source is between 2,100 and 2,120 feet (640 and 650 m) above sea level.

The headwaters of Chimneystack Run are on a saddle between Central Mountain and the westernmost portion of Red Rock Mountain. During a period of glaciation an ice lobe at the headwaters of Chimneystack Run nearly split the western part of a nunatak on Central Mountain and Red Rock Mountain. There are abandoned glacial meltwater channels near the stream's headwaters. Some bedrock ledge outcrops are present in the upper reaches of the watershed.

For most of its lower reaches, Chimneystack Run flows over a glacial till known as the Wisconsinan Bouldery Till. It is also present near the headwaters of the stream. Boulder colluvium and a glacial till known as the Wisconsinan Till occur along the stream's middle reaches. Most of the till in the vicinity of the creek is expected to be more than 6 feet (1.8 m) thick. The surface in these areas contains cobbles and boulders made of quartz, sandstone, and conglomerate. In the stream's upper reaches, the bedrock contains red and gray sandstone and shale. The bedrock underlies red-brown to yellow-brown diamict that contains clayey silt and sandy silt.

== Watershed ==
The watershed of Chimneystack Run has an area of 1.07 square miles (2.8 km^{2}). The stream is entirely within the United States Geological Survey quadrangle of Red Rock. It is located in the northeastern part of Sugarloaf Township.

== History and etymology ==
Chimneystack Run was entered into the Geographic Names Information System on August 2, 1979. Its identifier in the Geographic Names Information System is 1171790.

Chimneystack Run is named after Chimneystack Rock, a sandstone rock on Central Mountain. The rock itself is named for its resemblance to a chimneystack.

== Biology ==
Wild trout naturally reproduce in Chimneystack Run. The 1977 Columbia County Natural Resource Inventory states that the stream is an "excellent" stream for trout fishing.

== See also ==
- List of tributaries of Fishing Creek (North Branch Susquehanna River)
