= Spencer Run =

Spencer Run Spencer's Run

Physical characteristics
- Source
  - location: valley just south of Waller in Jackson Township, Columbia County, Pennsylvania
  - elevation: between 1,180 and 1,200 feet (360 and 370 m)
- Mouth
  - location: West Creek in Benton Township, Columbia County, Pennsylvania
  - coordinates: 41°12′19″N 76°23′20″W
  - elevation: 778 ft (237 m)
- Length: 2.1 mi (3.4 km)
- Basin size: 2.07 mi^{2} (5.4 km^{2})

Basin features
- Progression: West Creek → Fishing Creek → Susquehanna River → Chesapeake Bay
- Tributaries
  - right: one unnamed tributary

Spencer Run (also known as Spencer's Run) is a tributary of West Creek in Columbia County, Pennsylvania, in the United States. It is approximately 2.1 miles (3.4 km) long and flows through Jackson Township and Benton Township. The watershed of the stream has an area of 2.07 square miles (5.4 km^{2}). Wild trout naturally reproduce in the stream. The surficial geology in the area mainly features Illinoian Till, Illinoian Leg, alluvium, colluvium, and bedrock.

== Course ==
Spencer Run begins in a valley just south of Waller, in Jackson Township. It flows east and enters Benton Township after several hundred feet. The stream then turns southeast for several tenths of a mile, as its valley becomes deeper. It then turns south-southeast for several tenths of a mile before turning south, crossing Waller Drive, and receiving an unnamed tributary from the right. It then turns southeast for a few tenths of a mile before reaching its confluence with West Creek not far from the northwestern corner of Benton.

Spencer Run joins West Creek 1.48 miles (2.38 km) upstream of its mouth.

== Geography and geology ==
The elevation near the mouth of Spencer Run is 778 feet (237 m) above sea level. The elevation of the stream's source is between 1,180 and 1,200 feet (360 and 370 m) above sea level.

The surficial geology in the vicinity of Spencer Run mainly consists of colluvium and a till known as Illinoian Till, which contains silt and clay. However, at the headwaters of the stream, there is some Illinoian Lag. The sides of the stream's valley have surficial geology featuring bedrock consisting of sandstone and shale.

== Watershed ==
The watershed of Spencer Run has an area of 2.07 square miles (5.4 km^{2}). The stream is entirely within the United States Geological Survey quadrangle of Benton.

== History ==
Spencer Run was entered into the Geographic Names Information System on August 2, 1979. Its identifier in the Geographic Names Information System is 1188165.

Spencer Run was historically a direct tributary of Fishing Creek, instead of being a tributary of West Creek.

== Biology ==
Wild trout naturally reproduce in Spencer Run from its headwaters downstream to its mouth.

In 2004, the Columbia County Natural Areas Inventory recommended protecting Spencer Run.

== See also ==
- York Hollow, next tributary of West Creek going upstream
- List of tributaries of Fishing Creek (North Branch Susquehanna River)
- List of rivers of Pennsylvania
