= Fallow Hollow =

River in Pennsylvania, US

Coordinates: 41°15′47″N 76°20′27″W

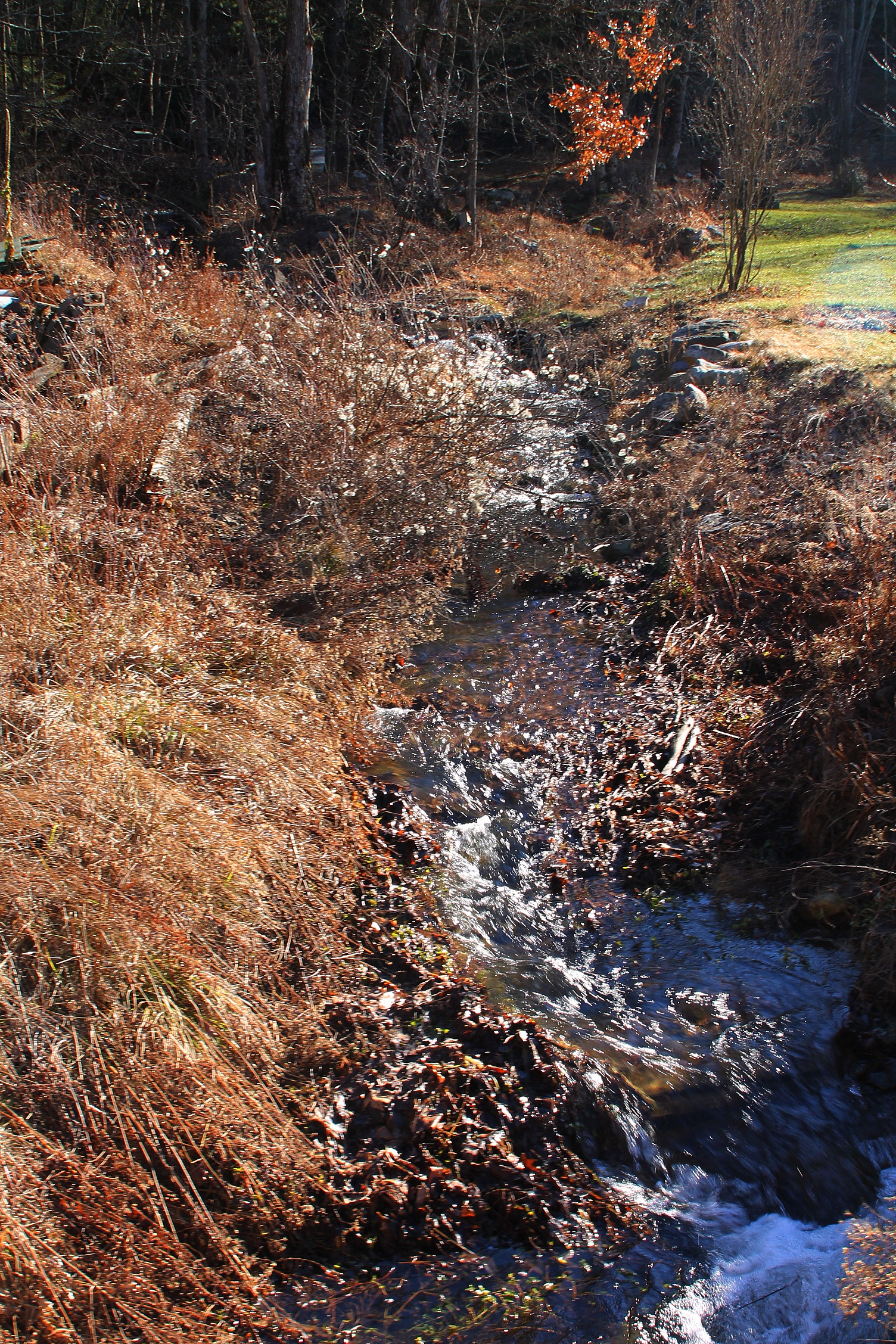
- Fallow Hollow looking upstream

Physical characteristics
- Source
  - location: pond in Sugarloaf Township, Columbia County, Pennsylvania
  - elevation: 1,220 to 1,240 feet (370 to 380 m)
- Mouth
  - location: Coles Creek in Sugarloaf Township, Columbia County, Pennsylvania
  - elevation: 994 ft (303 m)
- Length: 1.5 mi (2.4 km)
- Basin size: 0.96 mi^{2} (2.5 km^{2})

Basin features
- Progression: Coles Creek → Fishing Creek → Susquehanna River → Chesapeake Bay

Fallow Hollow is a tributary of Coles Creek in Columbia County, Pennsylvania, in the United States. It is approximately 1.5 miles (2.4 km) long and flows through Sugarloaf Township. The watershed of the stream has an area of 0.96 square miles (2.5 km^{2}). Fallow Hollow is listed on the Columbia County Natural Areas Inventory as a "Locally Significant Area". The stream is also Class A Wild Trout Waters.

== Course ==
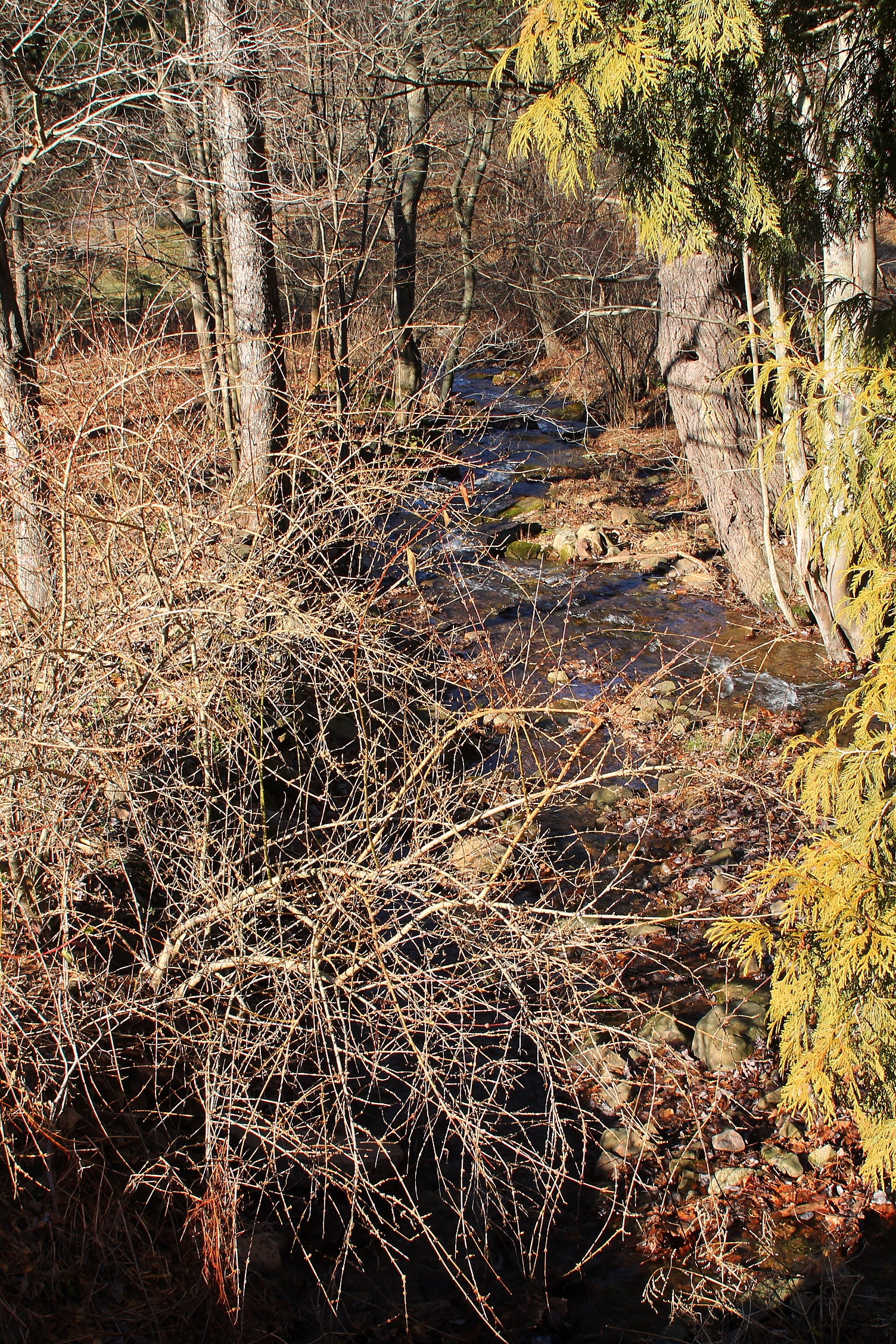
Fallow Hollow looking downstream

Fallow Hollow begins in a pond in Sugarloaf Township, near Ranch Road. It flows roughly south for less than half a mile before turning west. The stream then flows a slightly longer distance before turning northwest and beginning to flow parallel to Ripple Brook Road. A short distance downstream, it reaches its confluence with Coles Creek.

Fallow Hollow joins Coles Creek 2.54 miles (4.09 km) upstream of its mouth.

== Geography, watershed, and hydrology ==
The elevation near the mouth of Fallow Hollow is 994 feet (303 m) above sea level. The elevation at the source of the stream is between 1,220 feet (370 m) and 1,240 feet (380 m).

The watershed of Fallow Hollow has an area of 0.96 square miles (2.5 km^{2}). The entire length of the stream is on closed and private land.

There are numerous types of habitats in the watershed of Fallow Hollow. These include a pond, a shrub swamp, a forested ravine, a graminoid/forb opening, and a deciduous seepy forest. The last habitat has a thick understory of ferns.

The total concentration of alkalinity in the waters of Fallow Hollow is eight milligrams per liter.

== History and etymology ==
The etymology of Fallow Hollow's name is unknown.

The Columbia County Natural Areas Inventory of 2004 recommended that the riparian buffer around the wetlands in Fallow Hollow remain undisturbed. The inventory also advised against the introduction of beavers and suggested more deer hunting activity in the area.

Fallow Hollow is listed as a "locally significant site" on the Columbia County Natural Areas Inventory.

== Plants ==
In the higher elevations of the watershed of Fallow Hollow, the forest canopy consists of trees such as red maple, sugar maple, red oak, white oak, yellow birch, serviceberry, Eastern hemlock, and big-tooth aspen. The understory of this part of the watershed is inhabited by plants such as northern lady fern, hay-scented fern, New York fern, common wood fern, and starflower.

In the wetlands of Fallow Hollow, numerous shrubs and herbaceous plants live. These include sensitive fern, highbrush blueberry, cinnamon fern, winterberry holly, various sedges, and numerous other species. The hollow's seepy woods contain trees such as white pine, yellow birch, and eastern hemlock, and pignut hickory. Other plants in this part of the hollow include Japanese barberry, lowbush blueberry, partridge berry, red trillium, Indian cucumber, and witch hazel.

== Animals ==
Fallow Hollow has a fairly high level of bird biodiversity. The bird species inhabiting the hollow include four warblers, two vireos, two sparrows, and numerous other species, such as black-capped chickadee and pileated woodpeckers.

The watershed of Fallow Hollow is over-browsed by deer.

The entire watershed of Fallow Hollow is designated as a Coldwater Fishery, but is used as a High-Quality Coldwater Fishery. The stream's watershed is also Class A Wild Trout Waters. Trout (specifically brook trout) reproduce naturally in the stream between its headwaters and its mouth.

== See also ==
- Hess Hollow, next tributary of Coles Creek going upstream
- Ashelman Run, next tributary of Coles Creek going downstream
- List of tributaries of Fishing Creek (North Branch Susquehanna River)
