= Culley Run =

River in Pennsylvania, United States

Culley Run Cully Run, Colley Run
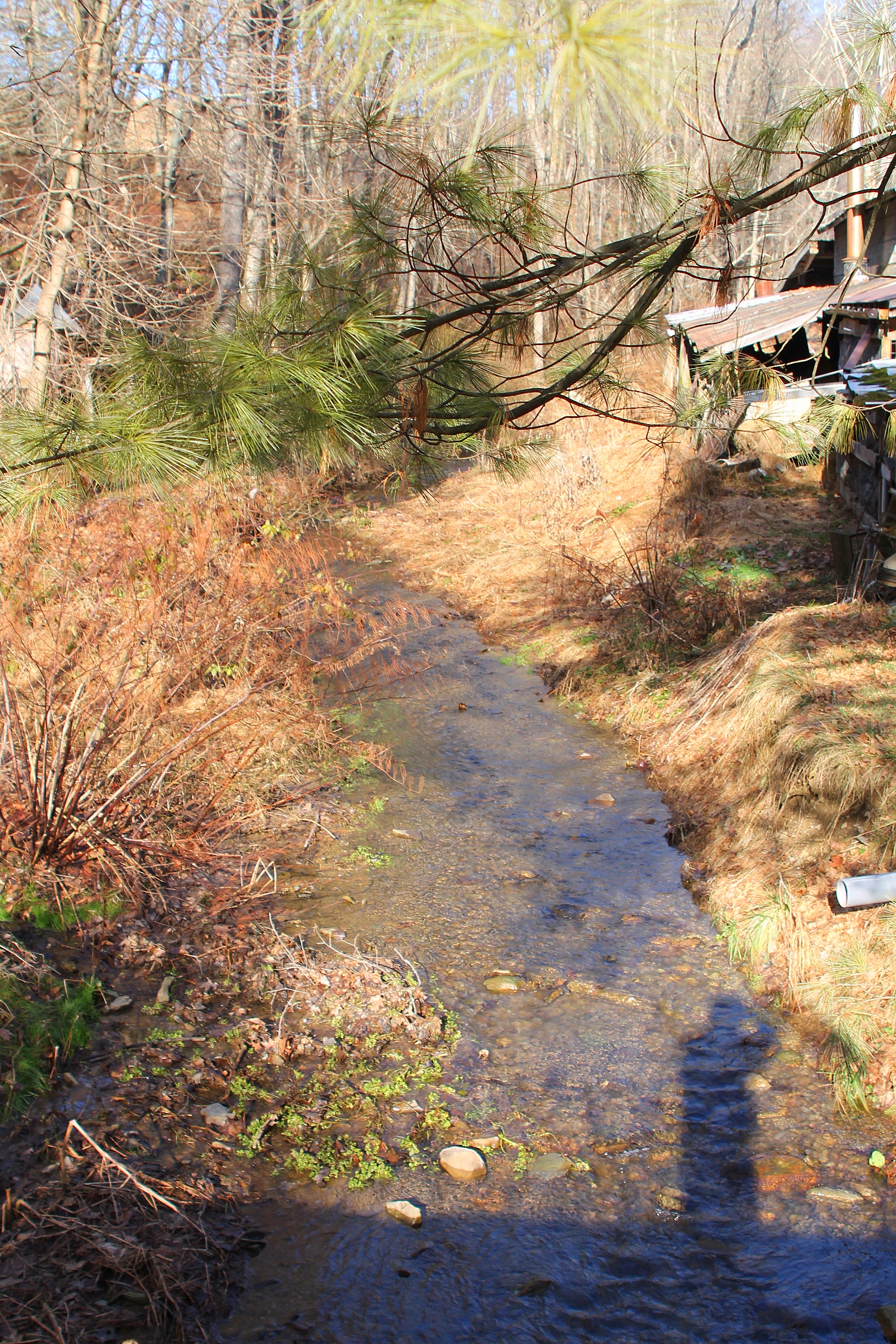
- Culley Run looking upstream

Physical characteristics
- Source
  - location: valley between Steinbuck Road and Cully Run Road in Benton Township, Columbia County, Pennsylvania
  - elevation: between 860 and 880 feet (260 and 270 m)
- Mouth
  - location: Fishing Creek in Benton Township, Columbia County, Pennsylvania
  - coordinates: 41°10′38″N 76°23′13″W
  - elevation: 718 ft (219 m)
- Length: 1.45 mi (2.33 km)
- Basin size: 1.45 mi^{2} (3.8 km^{2})

Basin features
- Progression: Fishing Creek → Susquehanna River → Chesapeake Bay

Culley Run (also known as Cully Run or Colley Run) is a tributary of Fishing Creek in Columbia County, Pennsylvania, in the United States. It is approximately 1.4 miles (2.3 km) long and flows through Benton Township. The stream's watershed has an area of 1.45 square miles (3.8 km^{2}). Shale, sandstone, alluvium, and glacial till can be found in the watershed. At least one bridge crosses the stream. The stream is most likely named after Alexander Colley, Sr.

== Course ==
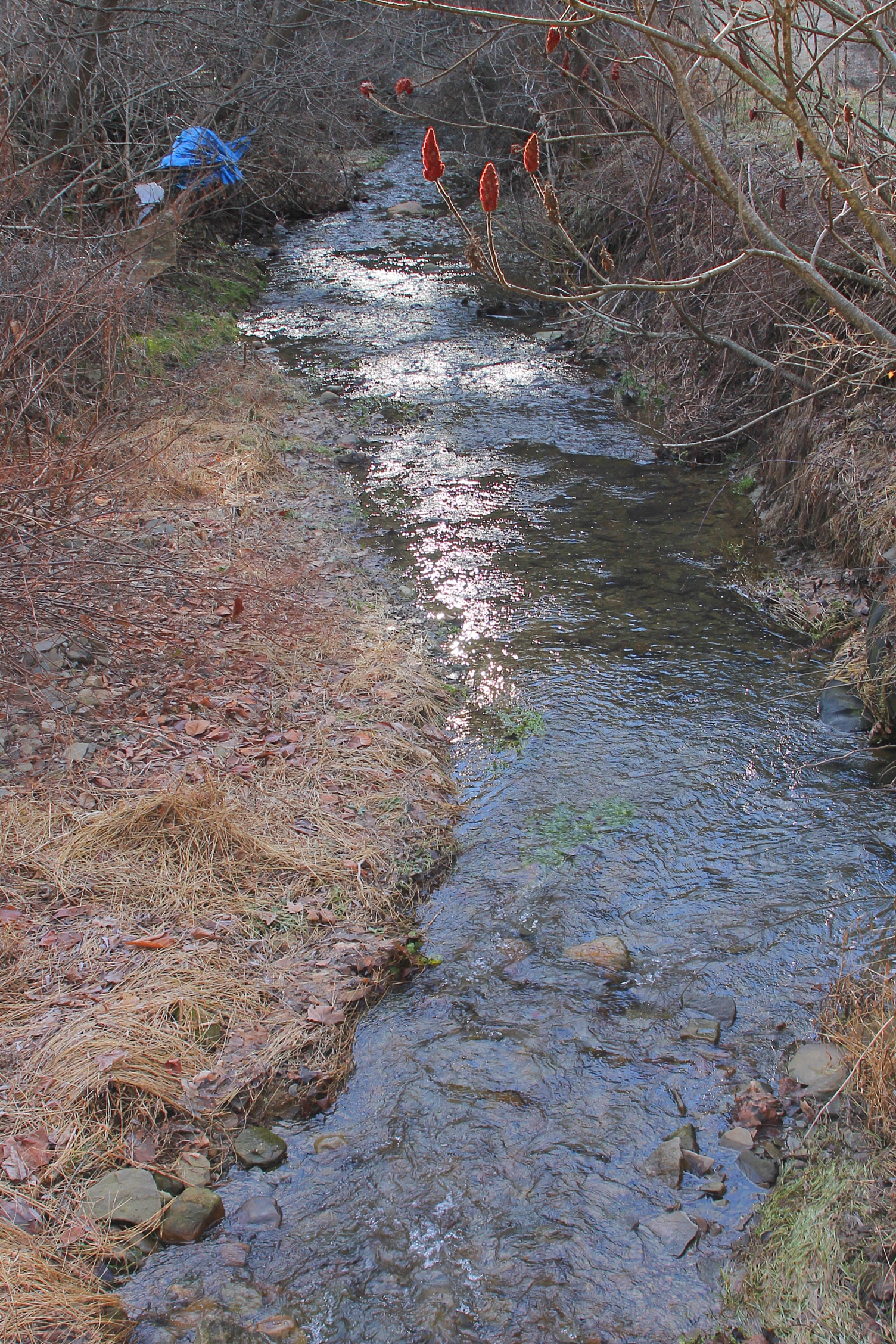
Culley Run looking downstream

Culley Run begins in a valley in Benton Township between Steinbuck Road and Cully Run Road. It flows southeast for several hundred feet, alongside Cully Run Road. It then turns east for a short distance and then turns south, still following the road. After a few tenths of a mile, the stream crosses Pennsylvania Route 254 and turns east-southeast for several tenths of a mile, flowing alongside Pennsylvania Route 254. After several tenths of a mile, it crosses Pennsylvania Route 254 again. Several hundred feet further downstream, it reaches its confluence with Fishing Creek, not far from the community of Maple Grove.

Culley Run joins Fishing Creek 21.16 miles (34.05 km) upstream of its mouth.

== Geography, geology, and watershed ==
The elevation near the mouth of Culley Run is 718 feet (219 m) above sea level. The elevation of the stream's source is between 860 and 880 feet (260 and 270 m) above sea level.

The Pennsylvania Department of Transportation has made plans to put 75 feet (23 m) of rock slope protection on the right bank of Culley Run at a location 0.75 miles (1.21 km) west of the intersection of Pennsylvania Route 254 with Pennsylvania Route 487. This project was expected to permanently affect 75 feet (23 m) of Culley Run and 110 feet (34 m) of Fishing Creek. The Pennsylvania Department of Transportation also has a permit to maintain a box culvert made of reinforced concrete on the stream. This culvert is 14.0 feet (4.3 m) long and 5.5 feet (1.7 m) high and is sunk 1 foot (0.30 m) into the streambed.

Culley Run flows over alluvium in its lower reaches. This alluvium contains stratified sand, silt, gravel, and some boulders. It is approximately 6 feet (1.8 m) thick. Colluvium can also be found in the vicinity of the stream's lower reaches. It contains shale and sandstone pieces of various sizes. A glacial till known as the Illinoian Till can be found in the upper reaches of the stream's watershed. Bedrock containing red and gray sandstone and shale also occurs in the watershed.

There is a bridge carrying Pennsylvania Route 254 over the stream. The bridge was repaired at one point for a cost of $104,000.

The watershed of Culley Run has an area of 1.45 square miles (3.8 km^{2}). The stream is entirely in the United States Geological Survey quadrangle of Benton.

== History and etymology ==
Culley Run was entered into the Geographic Names Information System on August 2, 1979. Its identifier in the Geographic Names Information System is 1172817.

In 2004, the Columbia County Natural Areas Inventory recommended protecting Culley Run.

Culley Run is also known as Colley Run. Walter M. Brasch asserts in his 1982 book Columbia County Place Names that Colley Run is the correct name of the stream, although it is officially known as Culley Run. Brasch states that the stream is most likely named after Alexander Colley, Sr., a surveyor and teacher who served on the Pennsylvania legislature from 1822 to 1823.

== See also ==
- Karnes Hollow, next tributary of Fishing Creek going downstream
- West Creek (Pennsylvania), next tributary of Fishing Creek going upstream
- List of tributaries of Fishing Creek (North Branch Susquehanna River)
- List of rivers of Pennsylvania
