= Ashelman Run =

Coordinates: 41.2751°N 76.3322°W

Physical characteristics
- Source
  - location: large pond in on the southern base of Central Mountain in Sugarloaf Township, Columbia County, Pennsylvania
  - elevation: between 1,160 and 1,180 feet (350 and 360 m)
- Mouth
  - location: Coles Creek in Sugarloaf Township, Columbia County, Pennsylvania
  - elevation: 1,033 ft (315 m)
- Length: 0.7 mi (1.1 km)
- Basin size: 0.57 mi^{2} (1.5 km^{2})

Basin features
- Progression: Coles Creek → Fishing Creek → Susquehanna River → Chesapeake Bay
- Tributaries
  - left: one unnamed tributary

Ashelman Run is a tributary of Coles Creek in Columbia County, Pennsylvania, in the United States. It is approximately 0.7 miles (1.1 km) long and flows through Sugarloaf Township. The stream's watershed has an area of 0.57 square miles (1.5 km^{2}). The stream is designated as a Coldwater Fishery. It is named after Daniel Ashelman, who lived in the area in the early 1800s. Glacial till and other geological features can be found in the vicinity of the stream. It has one unnamed tributary and there are two lakes in the watershed.

== Course ==
Ashelman Run begins in a large pond in Sugarloaf Township, on the southern base of Central Mountain. It flows southwest for several hundred feet, crossing Pennsylvania Route 118. The stream then turns south-southeast. After a few tenths of a mile, it receives an unnamed tributary from the left. Some distance further downstream, the stream reaches its confluence with Coles Creek.

Ashelman Run joins Coles Creek 3.54 miles (5.70 km) upstream of its mouth.

=== Tributaries ===
Ashelman Run has no named tributaries. However, it does have one unnamed tributary.

== Geography, geology, and watershed ==
The elevation near the mouth of Ashelman Run is 1,033 feet (315 m) above sea level. The elevation of the stream's source is between 1,160 and 1,180 feet (350 and 360 m) above sea level.

For most of its length, Ashelman Run flows over a glacial till known as the Wisconsinan Till. This glacial till is typically more than 6 feet (1.8 m) thick. However, the stream's lower reaches are on alluvium containing stratified silt, sand, and gravel. The alluvium is approximately 6 feet (1.8 m) thick. The stream also passes through a small patch of fill near its headwaters, where it crosses Pennsylvania Route 118. The Wisconsinan Till Moraine occurs a short distance north of its headwaters.

The watershed of Ashelman Run has an area of 0.57 square miles (1.5 km^{2}). The stream is entirely in the United States Geological Survey quadrangle of Red Rock. It is located in northeastern Sugarloaf Township. There are two small lakes in the watershed of the stream. One is located in the watershed's middle reaches and one is located in its upper reaches.

== History and etymology ==
Ashelman Run was entered into the Geographic Names Information System on August 2, 1979. Its identifier in the Geographic Names Information System is 1168447.

Ashelman Run is named after Daniel Ashelman. Ashelman most likely moved from the Wyoming Flats to a location near the stream in the early 1800s. He also constructed a log cabin close to the stream. The land near it was still owned by the Ashelman family as late as 1982.

== Biology ==
Wild trout naturally reproduce in Ashelman Run between its headwaters and its mouth. The stream is designated as a Coldwater Fishery.

== See also ==
- Fallow Hollow, next tributary of Coles Creek going downstream
- List of tributaries of Fishing Creek (North Branch Susquehanna River)
