= Sugarloaf Township, Pennsylvania =

Sugarloaf Township is the name of some places in the U.S. state of Pennsylvania:

- Sugarloaf Township, Columbia County, Pennsylvania
- Sugarloaf Township, Luzerne County, Pennsylvania
