= Davis Hollow =

River in the United States of America

Coordinates: 41°10′18″N 76°23′06″W

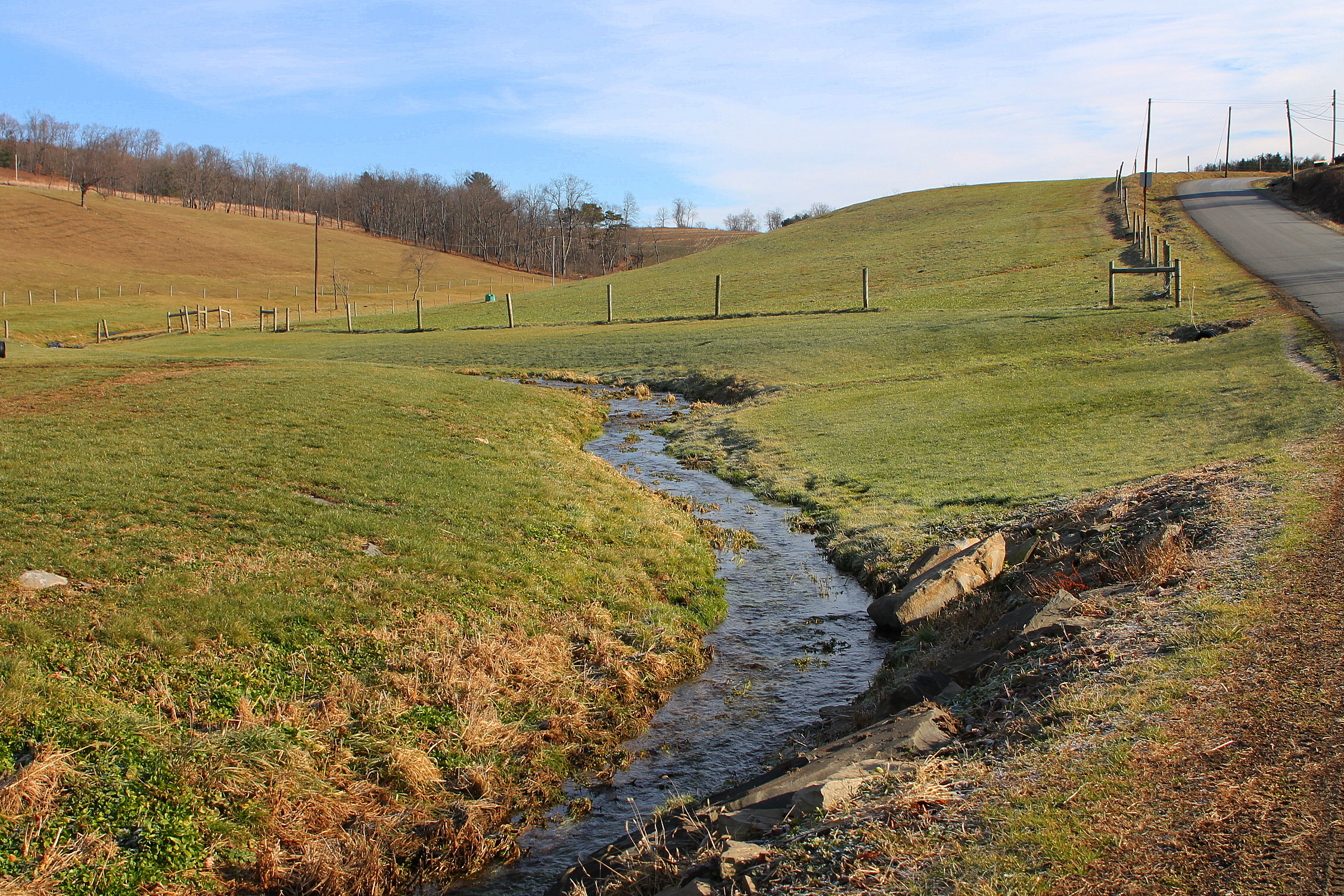
- Davis Hollow looking upstream

Physical characteristics
- Source
  - elevation: between 860 and 880 feet (260 and 270 m)
- Mouth
  - elevation: 735 ft (224 m)
- Length: 1.4 mi (2.3 km)
- Basin size: 0.80 mi^{2} (2.1 km^{2})

Basin features
- Progression: Fishing Creek → Susquehanna River → Chesapeake Bay

Davis Hollow is a tributary of Fishing Creek in Columbia County, Pennsylvania, in the United States. It is approximately 1.4 miles (2.3 km) long and flows through Benton Township. The watershed of the stream has an area of 0.80 square miles (2.1 km^{2}). The surficial geology in its vicinity mainly consists of alluvium, alluvial terrace, Wisconsinan Till, Wisconsinan Lag, Illinoian Flow-Till, and Illinoian Lag.

== Course ==
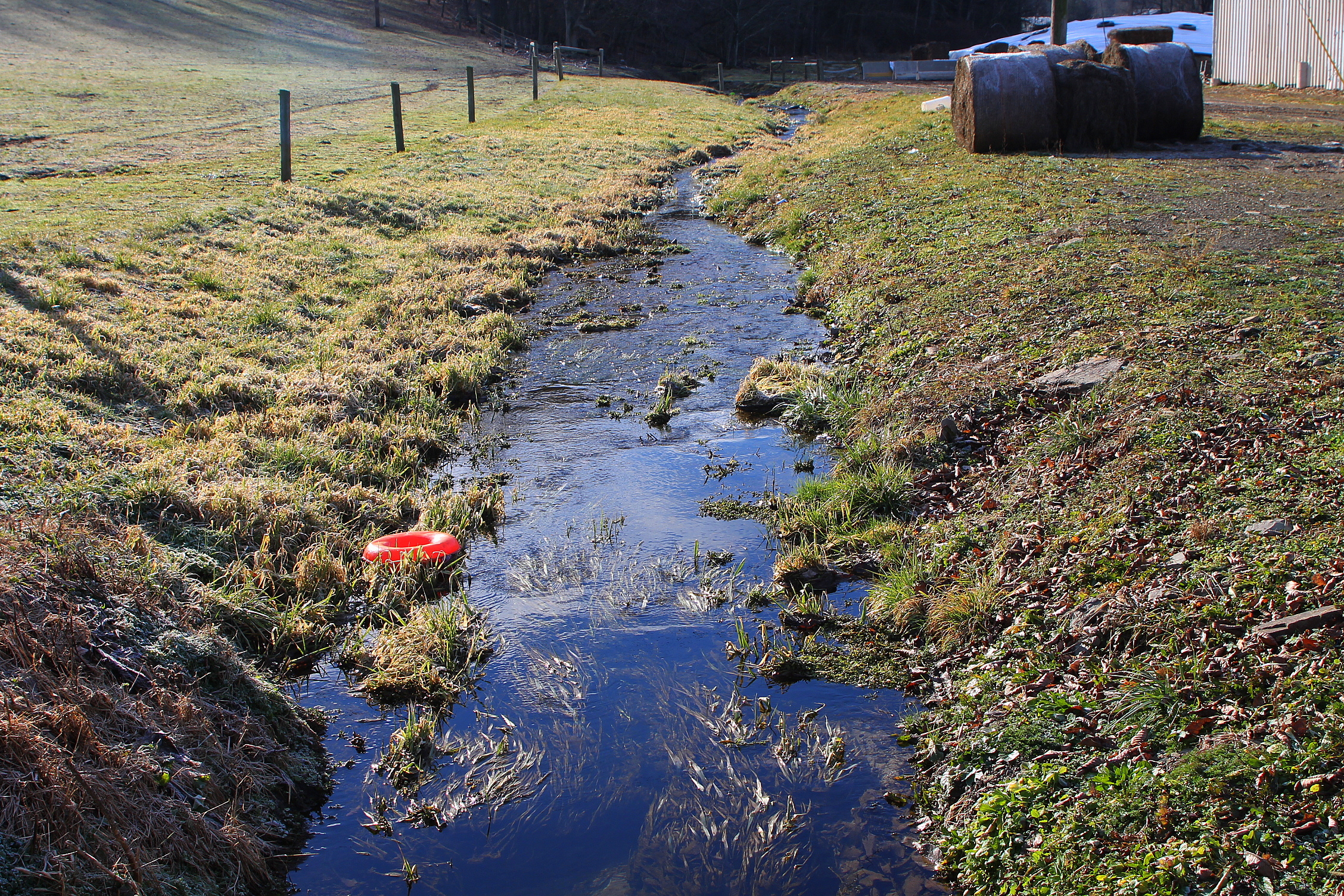
Davis Hollow looking downstream

Davis Hollow begins in a valley in Benton Township. It flows southwest for a short distance before turning west for several tenths of a mile, crossing Pied Piper Road. The stream then turns southwest for a few tenths of a mile, leaving the valley and entering a plain. It then turns southwest and crosses Pennsylvania Route 487 after several tenths of a mile. At this point, it turns south-southwest and reaches its confluence with Fishing Creek a short distance further downstream.

Davis Hollow joins Fishing Creek 20.78 miles (33.44 km) upstream of its mouth.

== Geography and geology ==
The elevation near the mouth of Davis Hollow is 735 feet (224 m) above sea level. The elevation of the stream's source is between 860 and 880 feet (260 and 270 m) above sea level.

There are two patches of alluvium, which contains stratified silt, sand, and gravel, near the upper reaches of Davis Hollow. However, the surficial geology in the area mainly consists of bedrock made of sandstone and shale as well as a glacial or resedimented till known as Wisconsinan Till. Some Wisconsinan Lag is present at the top of the valley. The surficial geology near the lower reaches of the stream mainly consists of alluvium, bedrock, alluvial terrace, Illinoian Lag, and a small patch of Illinoian Flow-Till.

In the valley of Davis Hollow, the Wisconsinan glacial terminus descends 240 feet (73 m) over the course of 1,000 feet (300 m) (1,267 feet (386 m) per mile).

== Watershed ==
The watershed of Davis Hollow has an area of 0.80 square miles (2.1 km^{2}). The mouth of the stream is in the United States Geological Survey quadrangle of Benton. However, its source is in the quadrangle of Stillwater.

== History and etymology ==
Davis Hollow was entered into the Geographic Names Information System on August 2, 1979. Its identifier in the Geographic Names Information System is 1172989.

Davis Hollow is an unnamed stream that takes the name of the valley it flows through. The valley is in turn likely named after a local farmer or landowner.

According to Walter Brasch's 1982 book Columbia County Place Names, some maps list the valley of Davis Hollow as being in Fishing Creek Township, while others list it as being near Rohrsburg.

== See also ==
- Raven Creek, next tributary of Fishing Creek going downstream
- Karnes Hollow, next tributary of Fishing Creek going upstream
- List of tributaries of Fishing Creek (North Branch Susquehanna River)
- List of rivers of Pennsylvania
