= Y Covered Bridge No. 156 =

- U.S. National Register of Historic Places
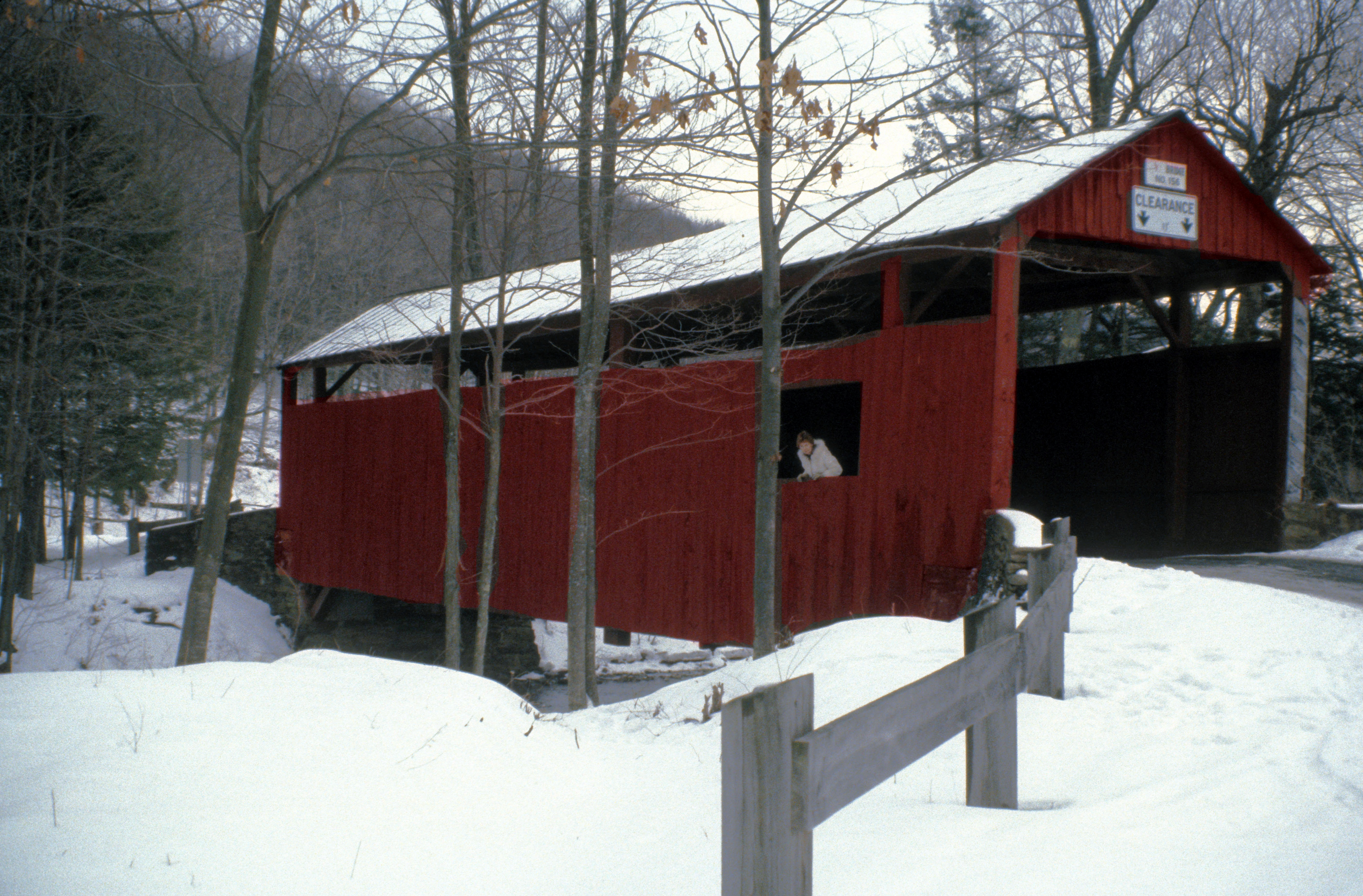

- Location within Pennsylvania Location within the United States
- Location: Pennsylvania Route 757, southeast of Central, Sugarloaf Township, Pennsylvania
- Coordinates: 41°17′23″N 76°21′52″W
- Area: 0.1 acres (0.040 ha)
- Built: 1887
- Built by: J.M. Larish
- Architectural style: Queen Post
- MPS: Covered Bridges of Columbia and Montour Counties TR
- NRHP reference No.: 79003176
- Added to NRHP: November 29, 1979

The Y Covered Bridge No. 156 was a historic wooden covered bridge that was located in Sugarloaf Township in Columbia County, Pennsylvania.

Listed on the National Register of Historic Places in 1979, it was destroyed in a suspicious fire on August 15, 1983.

== History and architectural features ==
This historic structure was a 76-foot-long (23 m), queen post truss bridge that was built in 1887. It crossed East Branch Fishing Creek and was one of twenty-eight historic covered bridges in Columbia and Montour Counties when it was destroyed by fire in 1983.

This bridge was listed on the National Register of Historic Places in 1979. Four years later, on August 15, 1983, it was destroyed during a suspicious fire.
