= West Creek (Pennsylvania) =

Tributary in Pennsylvania, United States

Coordinates: 41°11′06″N 76°23′28″W

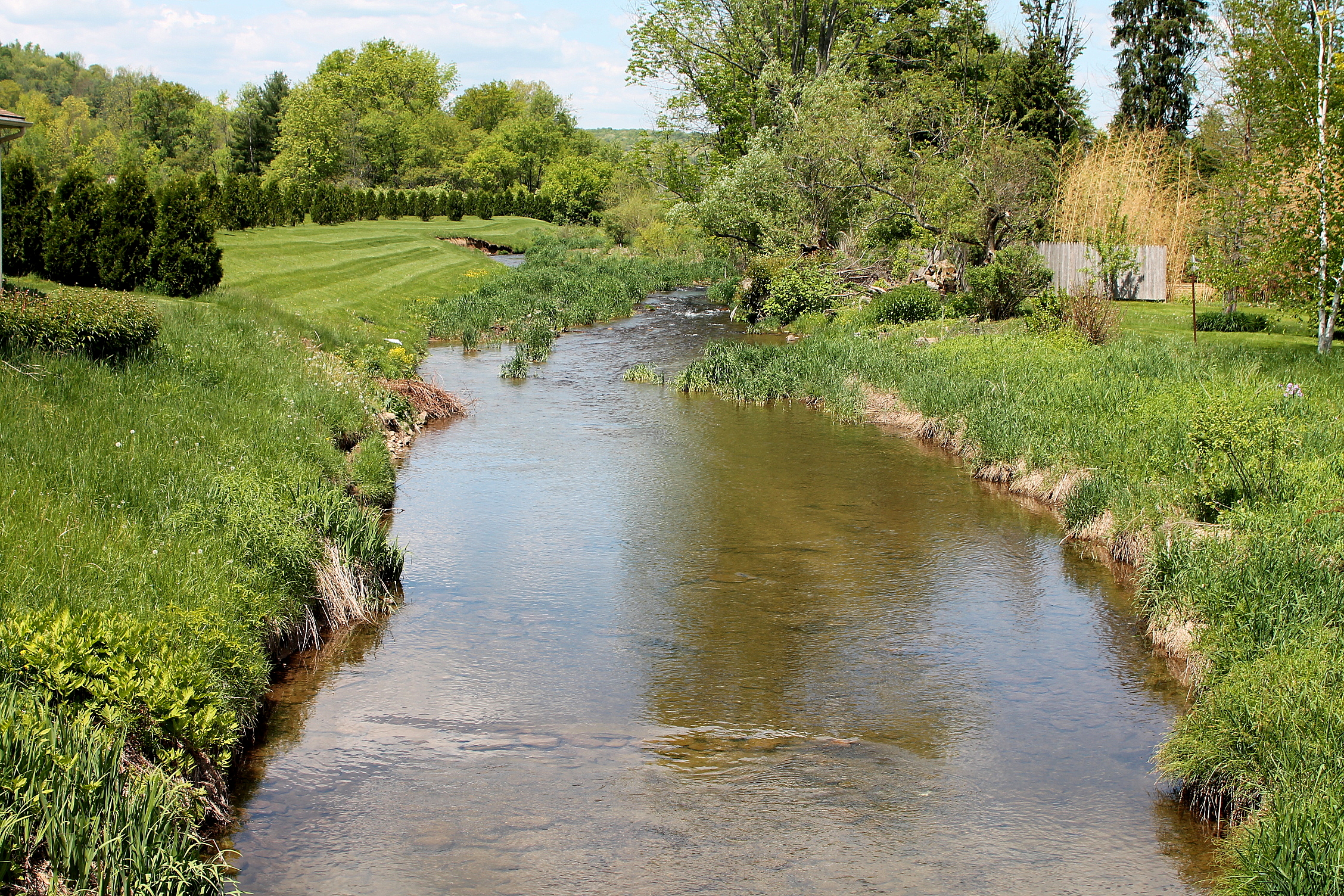
- West Creek on the outskirts of Benton, looking upstream

Physical characteristics
- Source
  - location: Huckleberry Mountain in Davidson Township, Sullivan County, Pennsylvania
  - elevation: between 1,780 and 1,800 feet (540 and 550 m)
- Mouth
  - location: Fishing Creek in Benton Township, Columbia County, Pennsylvania
  - elevation: 735 ft (224 m)
- Length: 9.1 mi (14.6 km)
- Basin size: 17.2 sq mi (45 km^{2})
- Discharge
  - average: typically less than 2 m^{3}/s or 71 cu ft/s

Basin features
- Progression: Fishing Creek → Susquehanna River → Chesapeake Bay
- Tributaries
  - right: York Hollow, Spencer Run

West Creek is a tributary of Fishing Creek, in Columbia County and Sullivan County, in Pennsylvania, in the United States. It is 9.1 miles (14.6 km) long and flows through Davidson Township in Sullivan County and Jackson Township, Sugarloaf Township, Benton Township, and Benton in Columbia County. The water temperature of the creek ranges from 0 °C (32 °F) to 25 °C (77 °F). The discharge ranges from nearly zero to ten cubic meters per second (0 to 353 cu ft/s). Rock formations in the watershed include the Trimmers Rock Formation, the Catskill Formation, and the Huntley Mountain Formation. The creek's watershed has an area of 16.6 square miles (43 km^{2}), most of which is agricultural, forested, or urban land. A small number of dams, mills, and schoolhouses were built on West Creek in the 19th and early 20th century. West Creek has the highest level of biodiversity of any stream in the upper Fishing Creek watershed.

== Course ==
West Creek begins on Huckleberry Mountain in Davidson Township, Sullivan County. It flows east for several hundred feet before turning south-southeast for several tenths of a mile, exiting Sullivan County and entering Jackson Township, Columbia County. It then turns south-southwest for a short distance, reaching the base of Huckleberry Mountain and crossing Pennsylvania Route 118, before southeast for a few miles in a valley, receiving one unnamed tributary from the left and another from the right. The creek then enters Sugarloaf Township and receives another unnamed tributary from the left and turns south. For the next few miles, it flows alongside West Creek Road and receives another unnamed tributary from the right. It then crosses Pennsylvania Route 239 and receives York Hollow, its first named tributary, from the right. The creek then turns southeast for several miles, flowing alongside Pennsylvania Route 239 and receiving another unnamed tributary from the left and entering Benton Township. It turns south for more than a mile, still flowing alongside Pennsylvania Route 239 and crossing it several times. The creek then exits its valley and turns south-southwest, flowing along the edge of a plain. After several tenths of a mile, it receives Spencer Run, its second and final named tributary, from the right and then turns south for more than a mile, passing along the western border of Benton. The creek then turns south-southeast and exits Benton. A few tenths of a mile further downstream, it reaches its confluence with Fishing Creek.

West Creek joins Fishing Creek 21.72 miles (34.95 km) upstream of its mouth.

== Hydrology ==
The water temperature in West Creek in the summer can be as high as 25 °C (77 °F), which is 3°C (5.4°F) higher than coldwater fish can tolerate. Between May 2010 and July 2011, it ranged from below 0 °C (32 °F) in February and March 2011 to 25 °C (77 °F) in August 2010.

Between May 2010 and July 2011, the concentration of dissolved oxygen in West Creek ranged from slightly under eight milligrams per liter (4.6×10^{−6} oz/cu in) in May 2010 to nearly seventeen milligrams per liter (9.8×10^{−6} oz/cu in) in late January 2011. This is well above the minimum required concentration of dissolved oxygen for optimal fish habitation.

West Creek is less affected by episodic acidification than most of the rest of the upper Fishing Creek watershed, with the exception of Coles Creek. The pH of West Creek is at its lowest in late winter and spring, when it is typically around 6.3. During the rest of the year, it is above 7.0. The entire pH range of the creek ranges from just over 6.0 to 7.2 or 7.3. The concentration of dissolved aluminum in West Creek is under 70 micrograms per liter (0.0049 gr/imp gal), considerably less than the concentration needed to kill fish. The aluminum concentration is, in fact, usually approximately zero and is often under 40 micrograms per liter (0.0028 gr/imp gal). However, early in 2011, the concentration was observed twice to be nearly 60 micrograms per litre (0.0042 gr/imp gal).

The discharge of West Creek is usually less than two cubic meters per second (71 cu ft/s). However, it sometimes is between two and five cubic meters per second (71 and 177 cu ft/s) and has occasionally been as high as nearly ten cubic meters per second (350 cu ft/s). The conductance of the creek ranges from slightly over 40 to more than 60 micro-siemens per centimeter.

== Geography and geology ==
The elevation near the mouth of West Creek is 735 feet (224 m) above sea level. The elevation of the creek's source is between 1,780 and 1,800 feet (540 and 550 m) above sea level.

The rock in the southern part of the watershed of West Creek is of the Trimmers Rock Formation. This consists of siltstone and shale and comes from the Devonian period. The northern part of the watershed has rock belonging to the Catskill Formation, which consists of sandstone and siltstone and also comes from the Devonian. The Huntley Mountain Formation can be found at the headwaters of the creek. This formation consists of sandstone and siltstone and comes from the Mississippian and Devonian periods.

== Watershed ==
The watershed of West Creek has an area of 17.2 square miles (45 km^{2}). The creek's mouth is in the United States Geological Survey quadrangle of Benton. However, its source is in the quadrangle of Elk Grove.

There is significant agricultural activity done in the lower reaches of the watershed of West Creek and there are also some residential areas. Additionally, there are some agricultural lands in the upper reaches of the watershed. Much of the rest of the watershed is forested land. Some of the most downstream parts of the watershed are urban.

== History and etymology ==
West Creek has been known by its current name since at least the late 1830s. The creek was entered into the Geographic Names Information System on August 2, 1979. Its identifier in the Geographic Names Information System is 1192054.

In 1799, a schoolhouse was constructed on West Creek near Benton. It was one of the first schoolhouses in the vicinity of Benton. During the 1864 elections, at least two Union soldiers were stationed on the creek, guarding the polling venues. A mill called the Thomas Mill was built on the creek in 1865 and remained operational in 1914, when it was owned by N.B. Cole. In the late 1800s and early 1900s, there was a timber-producing business on the creek, run by J. Harvey Creveling.

In 1881, J. J. McHenry constructed a queen truss covered bridge over West Creek for $348.00. The bridge was moved to South Branch Roaring Creek when it was sold to H. H. Knoebel in 1936. A two-span concrete tee beam bridge carrying Pennsylvania Route 239 was built over the creek in 1934. It is 65.9 feet (20.1 m) long and is located 2 miles (3.2 km) north of Benton. Another bridge of the same type, but with only a single, was built 3.5 miles (5.6 km) north of Benton in the same year. This bridge is 47.9 feet (14.6 m) long. A two-span steel stringer/multi-beam or girder bridge was constructed over the creek in Benton in 1951. It is 81.0 feet (24.7 m) long and carries State Route 4030. A bridge of the same time, was built 0.2 miles (0.32 km) north of Benton in 1958. It is 65.0 feet (19.8 m) long and carries T-720. A prestressed box beam or girders bridge carrying Pennsylvania Route 239 was built in 2004. It is located 1 mile (1.6 km) north of Benton and is 55.1 feet (16.8 m) long.

In 1914, the Benton Water Supply Company constructed a dam on West Creek upstream of Benton. A 10-acre (4.0 ha) private campground called the West Creek Gap Campgrounds was established at the headwaters of West Creek in 1979 by the wife of George Mikulski.

== Biology ==
There are 41 macroinvertebrate taxa that have been observed in West Creek, more than have been observed in all of upper Fishing Creek. The number of macroinvertebrates per square meter in West Creek at the site WC1 (in the lower reaches of the creek) is nearly 900, which is far higher than the number of macroinvertebrates per square meter in any other site except the site WC2, in the middle reaches of the creek. Site WC2 has a macroinvertebrate density of 600 macroinvertebrates per square meter. Approximately 60% of the taxa are Ephemeroptera (mayflies), 10% each are Plecoptera (stoneflies), and approximately 5% are Trichoptera (caddisflies).

There are a total of eight species of wild fish in West Creek. Brook trout and brown trout both inhabit West Creek, although brook trout are slightly more common than brown trout, with nine brook trout and only seven brown trout being observed in a 2010 or 2011 electrofishing survey. Trout are more common upstream of the Pennsylvania Route 239 crossing of the creek than downstream of it. The most common fish in the creek are sculpin, eastern blacknose dace, and cutlips minnows. In the aforementioned electrofishing survey, a total of 81 sculpin, 34 black-nosed dace, and 17 cutlips minnows were observed. Other species of fish in the watershed include johnny darter, white sucker, and creek chub.

In 2011, the habitat quality of upper Fishing Creek and its tributaries were rated on a scale of 1 to 200 (with a higher rating indicating better habitability) by Point Park University and the Fishing Creek Sportsmans' Association. The headwaters of West Creek were given a rating of 192. The rating is significantly lower further downstream, with it being 175 downstream of the crossing of Pennsylvania Route 239. The rating averages 138 where the creek is in Benton and the lowest rating is 115. This rating occurred downstream of the Market Street bridge in Benton.

The Shannon Diversity Index, which is commonly used to measure the diversity of biological communities, of West Creek is slightly over 2.5. The Hilsenhoff Biotic Index, a measure of pollution-tolerant macroinvertebrates, on much of the creek ranges from 1.6 to 2.5, although an area of the creek near Benton ranges from 2.6 to 3.5. There is little riparian buffering along the sections of West Creek where agriculture is done.

== See also ==
- Coles Creek (Pennsylvania), next tributary of Fishing Creek going upstream
- Culley Run, next tributary of Fishing Creek going upstream
- List of tributaries of Fishing Creek (North Branch Susquehanna River)
- List of rivers of Pennsylvania
