= Coles Creek (Pennsylvania) =

Stream in Pennsylvania, United States

Coordinates: 41°14′20″N 76°22′07″W

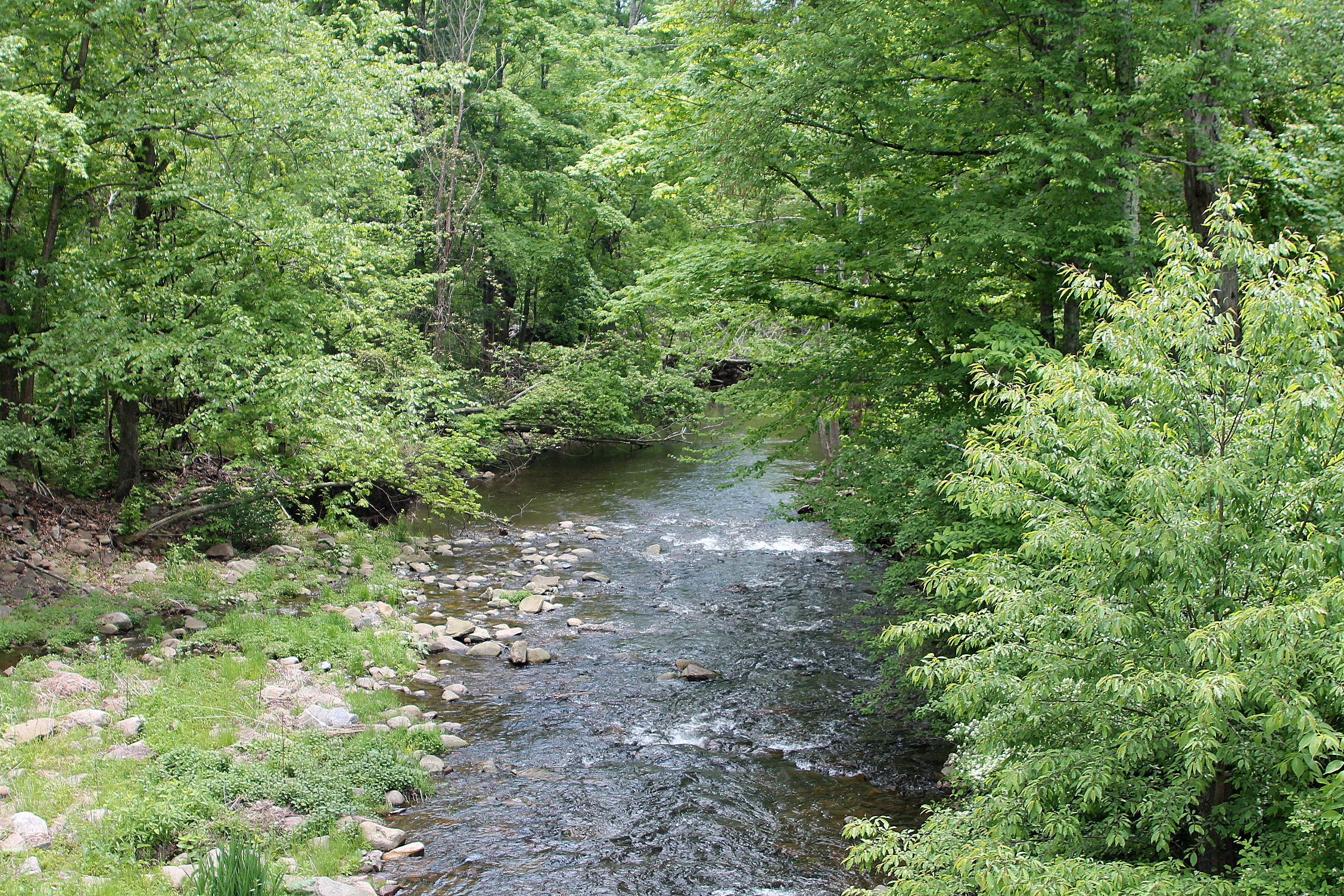
- The lower reaches of Coles Creek

Physical characteristics
- Source
  - location: northern Sugarloaf Township, Columbia County, Pennsylvania
- Mouth
  - location: Fishing Creek in southern Sugarloaf Township, Columbia County, Pennsylvania
- Length: 6.7 mi (10.8 km)
- Basin size: 11.6 mi^{2} (30 km^{2})
- Discharge
  - average: 0 to 8 cubic metres per second (0 to 283 cu ft/s); usually 0 to 2 cubic metres per second (0 to 71 cu ft/s)

Basin features
- Progression: Coles Creek → Fishing Creek → Susquehanna River → Chesapeake Bay
- Tributaries
  - left: Marsh Run, Fallow Hollow
  - right: Chimneystack Run, Ashelman Run, Hess Hollow

Coles Creek (also known as Cole's Creek) is a tributary of Fishing Creek, in Columbia County, Pennsylvania, and Sullivan County, Pennsylvania, in the United States. It is 6.0 miles (9.7 km) long and is the first named tributary of Fishing Creek downstream of where East Branch Fishing Creek and West Branch Fishing Creek meet to form Fishing Creek. The creek is on the edge of Columbia County and parts of its watershed are in Luzerne County.

The watershed of Coles Creek has an area of 11.6 square miles. There are 15.08 miles (24.27 km) of streams in the watershed. Most of the watershed is over rock of the Catskill Formation, although a small part of it is over rocks of the Huntley Mountain Formation. The water temperature of the creek ranges from slightly under 0 °C (32 °F) to slightly under 20 °C (68 °F). Coles Creek is named after Ezekiel Cole.

== Course ==
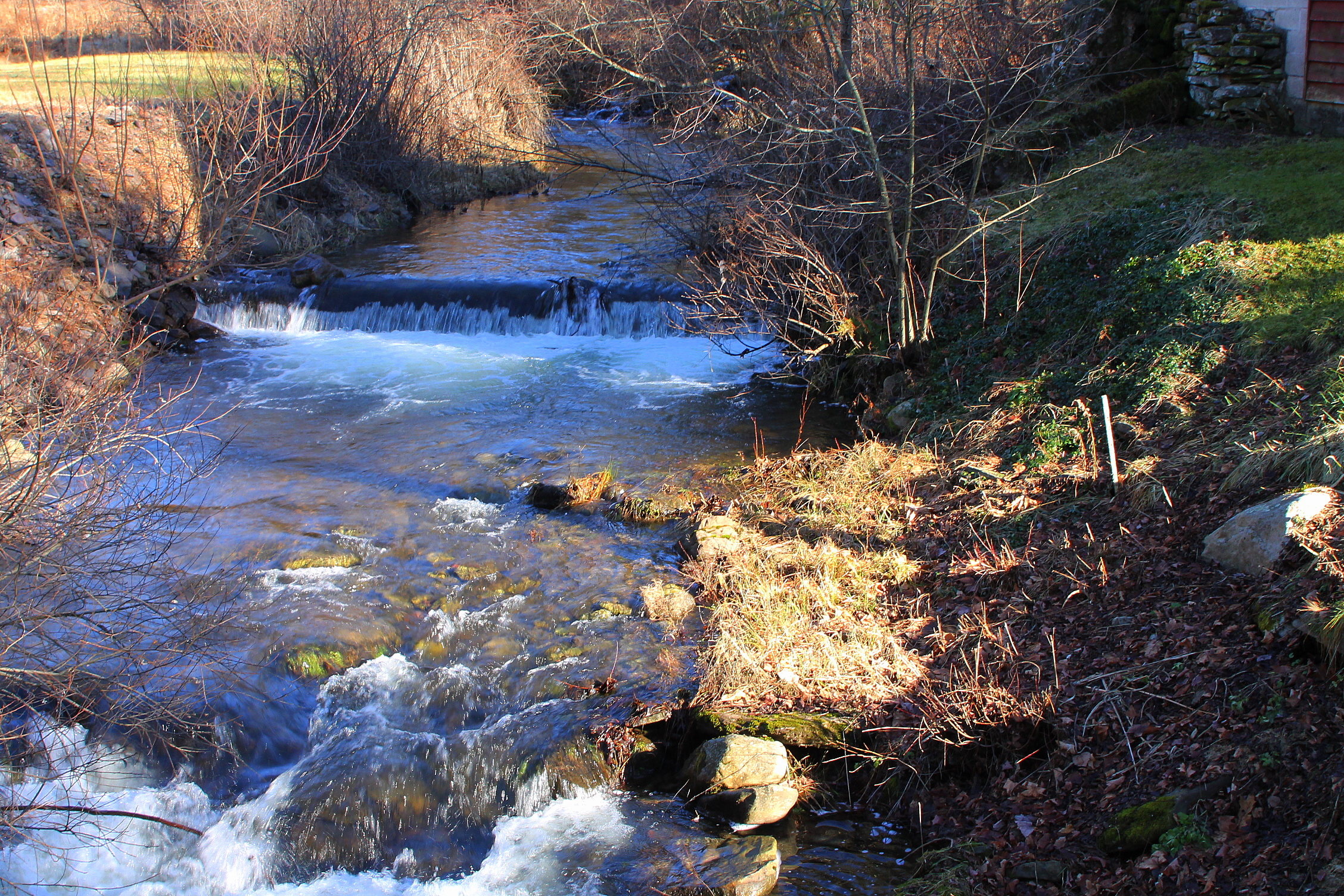
Coles Creek near Fallow Hollow

Coles Creek begins on Central Mountain in southeastern Sullivan County, Pennsylvania and flows south into Sugarloaf Township, Columbia County, near the border between Columbia County, Luzerne County, and Sullivan County. The creek flows south, leaving Central Mountain behind, to Pennsylvania Route 118, where it receives the tributary Chimneystack Run (which also starts on Central Mountain). It turns southwest and begins flowing parallel to Pennsylvania Route 487. It receives Ashelman Run and Fellow Hollow before flowing through the community of Tri Mills. Downstream of Tri Mills, it receives Hess Hollow and continues southwest to the community of Coles Creek. Shortly afterwards, the creek reaches its confluence with Fishing Creek.

== Hydrology ==
Between May 2010 and July 2011, the water temperature of Coles Creek ranged from slightly under 0 °C (32 °F) to nearly 20 °C (68 °F). The temperature was under 0 °C (32 °F) in January 2011, February 2011, and March 2011, and approached 20 °C (68 °F) in August 2010.

The concentration of dissolved oxygen in Coles Creek between May 2010 and July 2011 ranged from slightly under 7 milligrams per liter to just over 17 milligrams per liter. The dissolved oxygen concentration was just under 7 milligrams per liter in early June 2010 and was slightly over 7 milligrams per liter in August 2010. The concentration was over 17 milligrams per liter in late February 2011. This is the highest recorded concentration of dissolved oxygen at any point in the upper Fishing Creek watershed except Fishing Creek at Benton. The dissolved oxygen concentration in Coles Creek was also over 16 milligrams per liter in January 2011 and March 2011.

The pH of Coles Creek is sometimes only slightly above 6.0. However, it is usually between 6.5 and 7.5. The creek does not experience severe episodic acidification.

The discharge of Coles Creek is usually less than two cubic meters per second. However, it is sometimes between two and four cubic meters per second and in isolated instances can be as high as seven to eight cubic meters per second. In the creek, the pH tends to be lower when the discharge is higher.

The concentration of dissolved aluminum in Coles Creek is usually between 0 and 20 micrograms per liter. In some cases, it is between 20 and 40 micrograms per liter and in one case the concentration has been measured at approximately 70 micrograms per liter. The maximum concentration of dissolved aluminum in the creek is higher than in any other location in the upper Fishing Creek watershed except for East Branch Fishing Cree and West Branch Fishing Creek.

== Geology ==
Almost all of the watershed of Coles Creek lies over the Catskill Formation. This rock formation consists of sandstone and siltstone and comes from the Devonian period. The headwaters of the creek lie over the Huntley Mountain Formation. The Huntley Mountain Formation consists of sandstone and siltstone and comes from the Mississippian and Devonian periods.

There is a moraine at the confluence of Coles Creek with Fishing Creek. This causes there to be cone-shaped hills in the area.

== Watershed ==
The watershed of Coles Creek has an area of 11.6 square miles. The drainage density of the watershed is 1.3 per mile. There are 15.08 miles (24.27 km) of streams in the watershed. Most of the area along the creek is forested or residential. There are also scattered patches of agricultural land in the watershed. Additionally, there is a small patch of industrial land in the lower reaches of the creek. It occupies less than 0.09 square miles.

Major roads in the watershed of Coles Creek include Pennsylvania Route 118 and Pennsylvania Route 487. A community known as Coles Creek is located at the confluence of the creek with Fishing Creek.

== History ==
Coles Creek was likely named between 1800 and 1810 after Ezekiel Cole, a mill owner in the area.

A fish habitat made of log cross vanes was installed in the headwaters of Coles Creek in 2012.

== Biology ==
The biodiversity level of Coles Creek is similar to parts of the upper reaches of the main stem of Fishing Creek.

In 2011, the habitat quality of upper Fishing Creek and its tributaries were rated on a scale of 1 to 200 (with a higher rating indicating better habitability) by Point Park University and the Fishing Creek Sportsmans' Association. The lower reaches of the creek were given a score of 166 to 200, indicating an optimal habitat. The Hilsenhoff Biotic Index of the creek is 2.6, which is higher than average. The creek's Shannon Diversity Index is 2.3, which is slightly above average.

The Pennsylvania Fish and Boat Commission has designated Coles Creek to be Class A Wild Trout Waters between its source and the mouth of Marsh Run. Coles Creek and all of its tributaries support wild brook trout and wild brown trout.

There are nearly 200 aquatic macroinvertebrates per square meter in Coles Creek.

== See also ==
- East Branch Fishing Creek
- List of rivers of Pennsylvania
- West Branch Fishing Creek
- West Creek (Pennsylvania)
