= Karnes Hollow =

Physical characteristics
- Source
  - location: valley on Kramer Hill in Fishing Creek Township, Columbia County, Pennsylvania
  - elevation: between 980 and 1,000 feet (300 and 300 m)
- Mouth
  - location: Fishing Creek in Benton Township, Columbia County, Pennsylvania
  - coordinates: 41°10′25″N 76°23′09″W
  - elevation: 722 ft (220 m)
- Length: 1.1 mi (1.8 km)
- Basin size: 0.90 sq mi (2.3 km^{2})

Basin features
- Progression: Fishing Creek → Susquehanna River → Chesapeake Bay

Karnes Hollow is a tributary of Fishing Creek in Columbia County, Pennsylvania, in the United States. It is approximately 1.1 miles (1.8 km) long and flows through Fishing Creek Township and Benton Township. The watershed of the stream has an area of 0.90 square miles (2.3 km^{2}). The stream is named after a valley whose etymology is unknown. The surficial geology in its vicinity consists of colluvium, alluvium, Illinoian Till, Illinoian Lag, and bedrock consisting of sandstone and shale.

== Course ==
Karnes Hollow begins in a valley on Kramer Hill in Fishing Creek Township. It flows north for a short distance before turning north-northeast for several tenths of a mile. The stream then turns northeast for several tenths of a mile, entering Benton Township. It then turns east and reaches its confluence with Fishing Creek a few hundred feet further downstream.

Karnes Hollow joins Fishing Creek 20.90 miles (33.64 km) upstream of its mouth.

== Geography and geology ==
The elevation near the mouth of Karnes Hollow is 722 feet (220 m) above sea level. The elevation of the stream's source is between 980 and 1,000 feet (300 and 300 m) above sea level.

Along most of the length of Karnes Hollow, the surficial geology features colluvium. However, alluvium (which contains stratified sand, silt, and gravel, as well as some boulders), is present near the mouth of the stream. There are also some patches of Illinoian Till and Illinoian Lag in the middle and upper reaches of the watershed. The surficial geology everywhere else in the stream's vicinity consists of bedrock consisting of sandstone and shale.

== Watershed ==
The watershed of Karnes Hollow has an area of 0.90 square miles (2.3 km^{2}). The stream is entirely within the United States Geological Survey quadrangle of Benton.

Karnes Hollow is located to the northwest of the community of Stillwater and some distance to the south of Benton. The stream is in the north-central part of Fishing Creek Township and in the east-central part of the quadrangle of Benton.

There are no roads crossing Karnes Hollow. However, Kramer Hill Road runs relatively close to the stream for its entire length, staying within several hundred feet of it and at times approaching to within 200 feet (61 m).

== History and etymology ==
Karnes Hollow was entered into the Geographic Names Information System on August 2, 1979. Its identifier in the Geographic Names Information System is 1178233.

Karnes Hollow is an unnamed stream that takes the name of the valley through which it flows. The etymology of the valley is unknown.

== See also ==
- Davis Hollow, next tributary of Fishing Creek going downstream
- Culley Run, next tributary of Fishing Creek going upstream
- List of tributaries of Fishing Creek (North Branch Susquehanna River)
- List of rivers of Pennsylvania
