= Walter Brasch =

American journalist (1945–2017)

Walter M. Brasch
- Born: March 2, 1945
- Died: February 9, 2017 (aged 71)
- Education: A.B. in sociology, San Diego State College, M.A. in journalism, Ball State University, Ph.D. in mass communication and journalism, Ohio University
- Occupations: Journalist, university professor
- Known for: Syndicated newspaper columnist, author of 17 books
- Awards: Civil Liberties Award (ACLU), Points of Excellence (SDSU), Creative Teaching Award (Bloomsburg University), Martin Luther King Jr. Distinguished Humanitarian Service Award (2004)

Walter M. Brasch (March 2, 1945 – February 9, 2017) was an American social issues journalist and university professor of journalism. He was the author of a weekly syndicated newspaper column and the author of 17 books. He was a newspaper editor in California, Iowa, Indiana, and Ohio, and a senior editor at OpEdNews., He died on February 9, 2017.

== Education ==
Dr. Brasch earned an A.B. in sociology from San Diego State College, an M.A. in journalism from Ball State University, and a Ph.D. in mass communication and journalism, with a cognate area in language and culture studies, from Ohio University.

== Awards ==
Brasch won more than 100 national and regional awards from the National Society of Newspaper Columnists, Society of Professional Journalists, National Federation of Press Women, Pennsylvania Press Club, Pennsylvania Women's Press Association, Pennwriters, International Association of Business Communicators, Pacific Coast Press Club, and Press Club of Southern California.

He was not only a co-recipient of the Civil Liberties Award of the American Civil Liberties Union in 1996, but was also honored by San Diego State University as a Points of Excellence winner in 1997. At Bloomsburg University, he earned the Creative Arts Award, was the first recipient of the Creative Teaching Award, and the first to receive a second award. He was named an Outstanding Student Advisor. He was the first recipient of the Dean's Award of Excellence at Bloomsburg University. For the Pennsylvania Humanities Council, he was a Commonwealth Speaker. In 2004 he was the faculty recipient of the Martin Luther King Jr. Distinguished Humanitarian Service Award.

== Published works ==
He co-authored Social Foundations of the Mass Media (2001) and The Press and the State (1986), and was awarded Outstanding Academic Book distinction by Choice magazine, published by the American Library Association.
