= Central Mountain =

Mountain in northeastern Pennsylvania, United States

Coordinates: 41°18′00″N 76°20′47″W

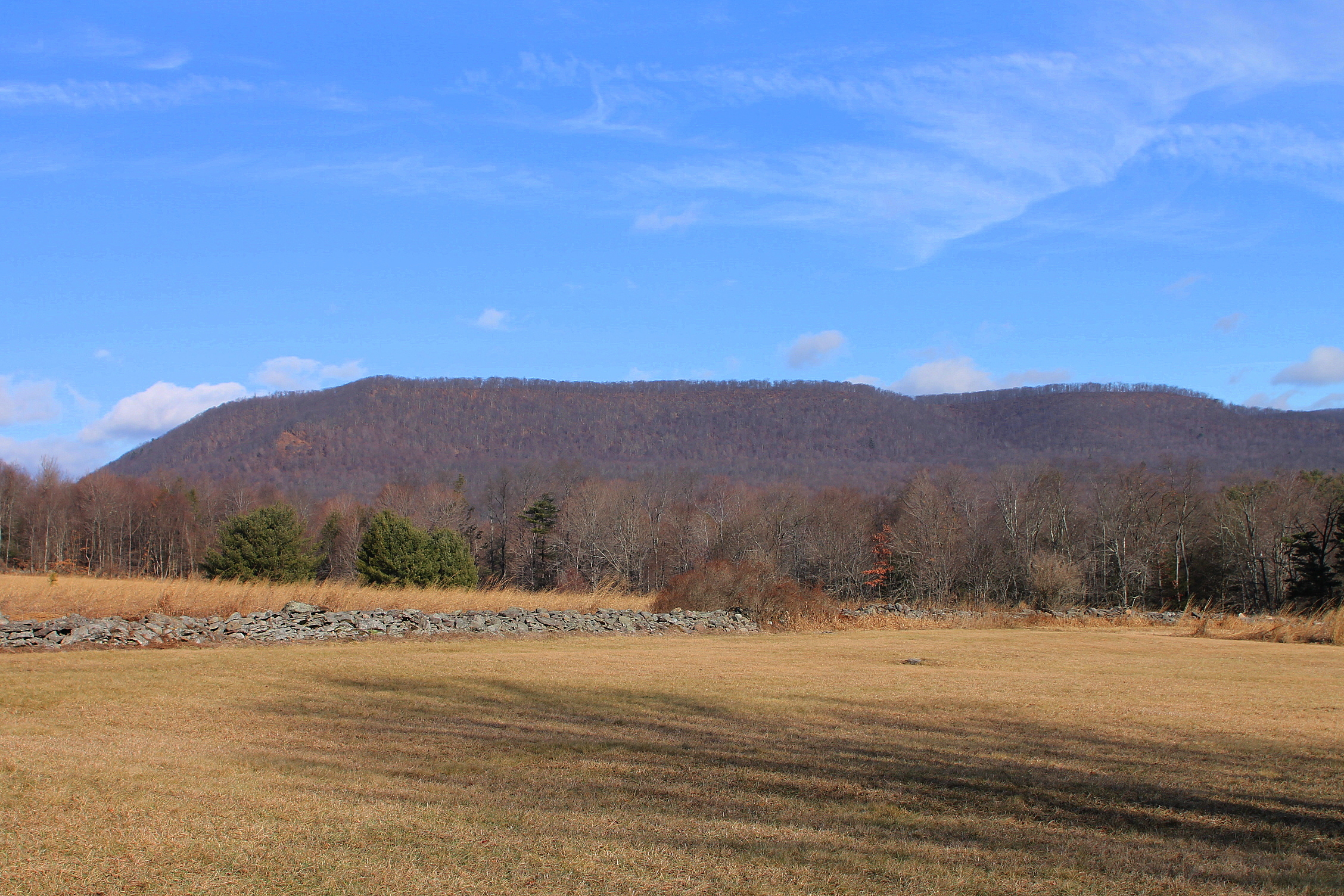
Central Mountain in wintertime

Central Mountain is a mountain in Columbia County, Sullivan County, and Luzerne County, in Pennsylvania, United States. Its elevation is 2,247 feet (685 m) above sea level. The mountain is part of the Allegheny Front. Rock formations on the mountain include the Pocono Formation and the Duncannon Member of the Catskill Formation. It was historically known as North Mountain, but it was renamed Central Mountain (after the village of Central) in the late 1800s. The mountain is one of the most important sites on the Columbia County Natural Areas Inventory and it is inhabited by dozens of trees, shrubs, and herbaceous plants. Numerous birds and several amphibians and mammals are also found in the area.

== Geography and geology ==
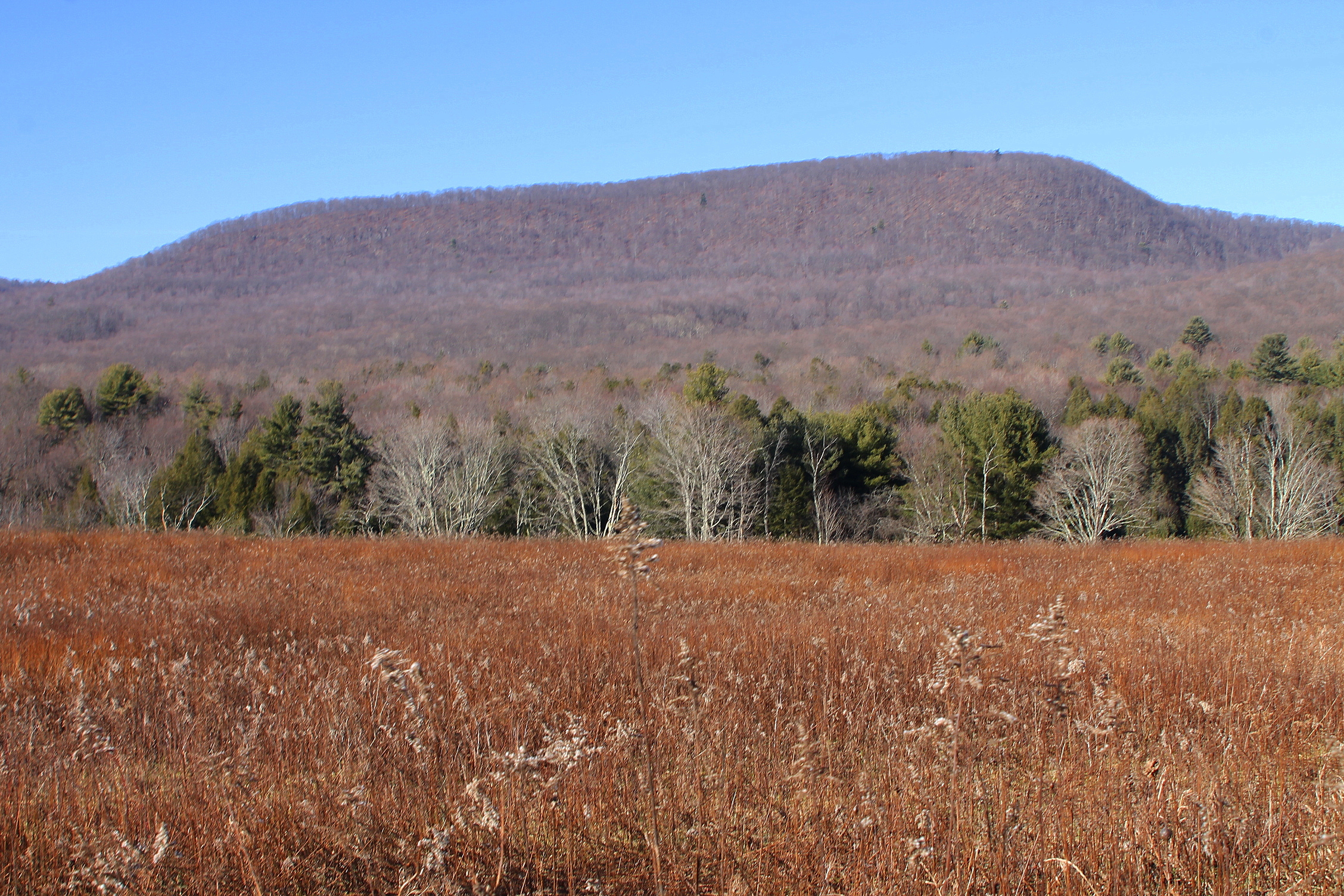
Central Mountain from Pennsylvania Route 118

Central Mountain has an official elevation of 2,247 feet (685 m), making it the second-highest mountain in Columbia County, after Red Rock Mountain. It is the northernmost mountain in Columbia County. The mountain is on the Allegheny Front.

A creek known as East Branch Fishing Creek flows along the base of Central Mountain. Morainic topography consisting of knobs and kettles occurs on the lowest 200 to 500 feet (61 to 152 m) of the side of the mountain.

Central Mountain's official coordinates are in the United States Geological Survey quadrangle of Red Rock. The mountain is located partially in northeastern Sugarloaf Township and partially in Sullivan County and Luzerne County.

A rock formation known as the Duncannon Member of the Catskill Formation occurs on Central Mountain. It is 500 to 600 feet (150 to 180 m) thick at this location. Additionally, the Pocono Formation, a rock formation from the Mississippian Period, occurs on the mountain.

The soils on Central Mountain are deep-muck soils that are saturated with water.

== History and etymology ==
Central Mountain was historically known as North Mountain due to the fact that it is the northernmost mountain in Columbia County. Between 1860 and 1900, it came to be known as Central Mountain, after the village of Central. Central Mountain became the most common name for the mountain by the 1890s, during the period where the lumber industry was prevalent in the area.

A school district and geographical district named Central District existed in the 1800s in Sugarloaf Township. It was named after Central Mountain and the village of Central.

In the 21st century, potential threats to the natural habitats on the mountain include logging and all terrain vehicle trails.

== Plants ==
Central Mountain is listed on the Columbia County Natural Areas Inventory. It is one of the most important sites on the inventory, with a priority rank of 1 on a scale of 1 to 5, with 1 being the most important. The only other sites in Columbia County with a rank of 1 are South Branch Roaring Creek and the Susquehanna River.

The entire northern part of Columbia County, including Central Mountain, is covered in northern hardwood forests. Ecosystems on the mountain include an Ephemeral/Fluctuating Pool Natural Community and a Hemlock Palustrine Forest Natural Community. The mountain contains forested wetlands consisting mainly of hemlock trees. There are open sedge meadows in some places.

Sphagnum mosses, sedges, and other herbaceous plants grow on Central Mountain. The federally endangered northeastern bulrush also grows on it. Numerous species use the mountain as a habitat. In addition to hemlock, the main tree species on the mountain include yellow birch, black birch, black gum, sugar maple, red maple, white oak, chestnut oak, red oak, white pine, sassafras, basswood, tulip poplar, pignut hickory, mockernut hickory, shagbark hickory, and ash.

Numerous shrub species inhabit Central Mountain. These include mountain laurel, black huckleberry, highbush blueberry, low sweet blueberry, gooseberry, swamp dewberry witch-hazel, greenbriar, and striped maple. Many herbaceous plants also inhabit the mountain. These include various sedges and also ferns, such as Christmas fern, sweet fern, hay-scented fern, and interrupted fern. Other herbaceous plant species include black bulrush, false hellebore, jewelweed, partridgeberry, smartweeds, soft rush, false Solomon's seal, stinging nettle, swamp milkweed, Sphagnum moss, sweet vernal grass, teaberry, trailing arbutus, violets, whorled loosestrife, and woolgrass.

== Animals ==
Numerous bird species inhabit Central Mountain. These include four warbler species, three vireo species, the hermit thrush, the dark-eyed junco, the veery, the black-capped chickadee, the ovenbird, the gray catbird, the common yellowthroat, the scarlet tanager, the eastern towhee, and the eastern wood pewee. Amphibians inhabiting the mountain include wood frogs, pickerel frogs, dusky salamanders, and red spotted newts. Mammals inhabiting the mountain include white-tailed deer and black bears.

== See also ==
- North Mountain (Pennsylvania)
