= Tributaries of Fishing Creek (North Branch Susquehanna River tributary) =

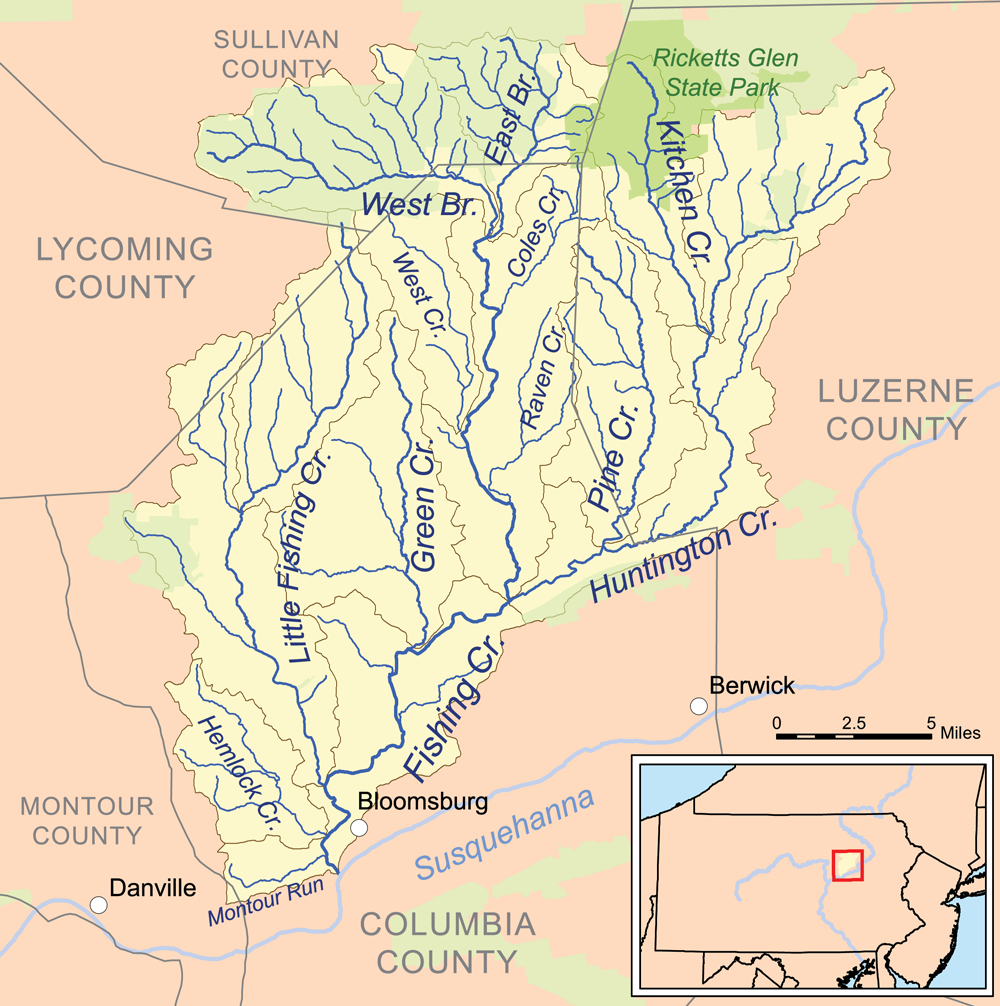
A map of the Fishing Creek watershed

There are 17 named tributaries of the main stem of Fishing Creek, a 30-mile-long (50 km) stream in Columbia County, Pennsylvania, in the United States and a tributary of the Susquehanna River. The creek also has numerous sub-tributaries. The creek's watershed has an area of 385 square miles (1,000 km^{2}). The watersheds of Little Fishing Creek and Huntington Creek, Fishing Creek's two largest tributaries, make up nearly 45 percent of the Fishing Creek watershed (182.1 square miles (472 km^{2})).

The tributaries of the main stem of Fishing Creek consist of nine creeks, three runs, one brook, and four hollows.

== Main stem tributaries ==
Name	River miles	Watershed area (square miles)	Image
Montour Run	0.72	4.62	
Hemlock Creek	1.52	16.5	
Little Fishing Creek	3.86	68.1	
Stony Brook	8.1	3.72	
Deerlick Run	9.45	6.1	
Green Creek	10.84	36.8	
Huntington Creek	15.1	114	
Creasy Hollow	15.72	1.3	
Bee Sellers Hollow	17.26	1.58	
Raven Creek	18.62	11.9	
Davis Hollow	20.78	0.8	
Karnes Hollow	20.9	0.9	
Culley Run	21.16	1.45	
West Creek	21.72	17.2	
Coles Creek	26.34	11.9	
East Branch Fishing Creek	29.98	19.3	
West Branch Fishing Creek	29.98	32.9	

== Tributaries of Hemlock Creek ==
Name	River miles	Watershed area (square miles)	Image
Frozen Run	2.26	3.55	
West Hemlock Creek	3.02	2.8	

== Tributaries of Little Fishing Creek ==
Name	River miles	Watershed area (square miles)	Image
Spruce Run	5.87	9.80	
West Branch Run	11.16	10.20	
Lick Run	12.02	4.40	
Wolfhouse Run	13.28	2.03	
Devil Hole Run			
Little Brier Run	18.90	2.62	

== Tributaries of Green Creek ==
Name	River miles	Watershed area (square miles)	Image
Mud Run	3.06	13.3	
Rickard Hollow	3.56	2.22	
Little Green Creek	4.16	5.01	

== Tributaries of Huntington Creek ==
Name	River miles	Watershed area (square miles)	Image
Pine Creek	4.26	30.7	
Kingsbury Brook	6.08	1.27	
Rogers Creek	12.9	7.1	
Marshall Hollow	15.12		
Kitchen Creek	16.02	20.1	
Phillips Creek	19.12	5.54	
Lick Branch	19.64	2.34	
Arnold Creek	21.18	4.72	
Shingle Run	22.18	1.83	
Laurel Run	22.82	1.29	
Mitchler Run	23.5	1.52	

== Tributaries of Coles Creek ==
Name	River miles	Watershed area (square miles)	Image
Hess Hollow	2.06	1.25	
Fallow Hollow	2.54	0.96	
Ashelman Run	3.54	0.57	
Marsh Run	4.48	0.44	
Chimneystack Run	4.70	1.07	

== Tributaries of East Branch Fishing Creek ==
Name	River miles	Watershed area (square miles)	Image
Blackberry Run	3.08	1.91	
Trout Run	3.60	0.62	
Lead Run	4.12	0.82	
Heberly Run	4.50	6.42	
Big Run		1.38	
Sullivan Branch			

== Tributaries and sub-tributaries of Heberly Run ==
Name	River miles	Watershed area (square miles)	Image
Quinn Run	1.40	2.31	
Meeker Run	2.93	0.41	
Shanty Run	0.48	0.67	

== Tributaries of Sullivan Branch ==
Name	River miles	Watershed area (square miles)	Image
Pigeon Run		0.78	
Hunts Run		0.40	
Ore Run		0.78	
