= Sugarloaf Township, Columbia County, Pennsylvania =

Township in Pennsylvania, US

Coordinates: 41°17′30″N 76°22′59″W

- Township
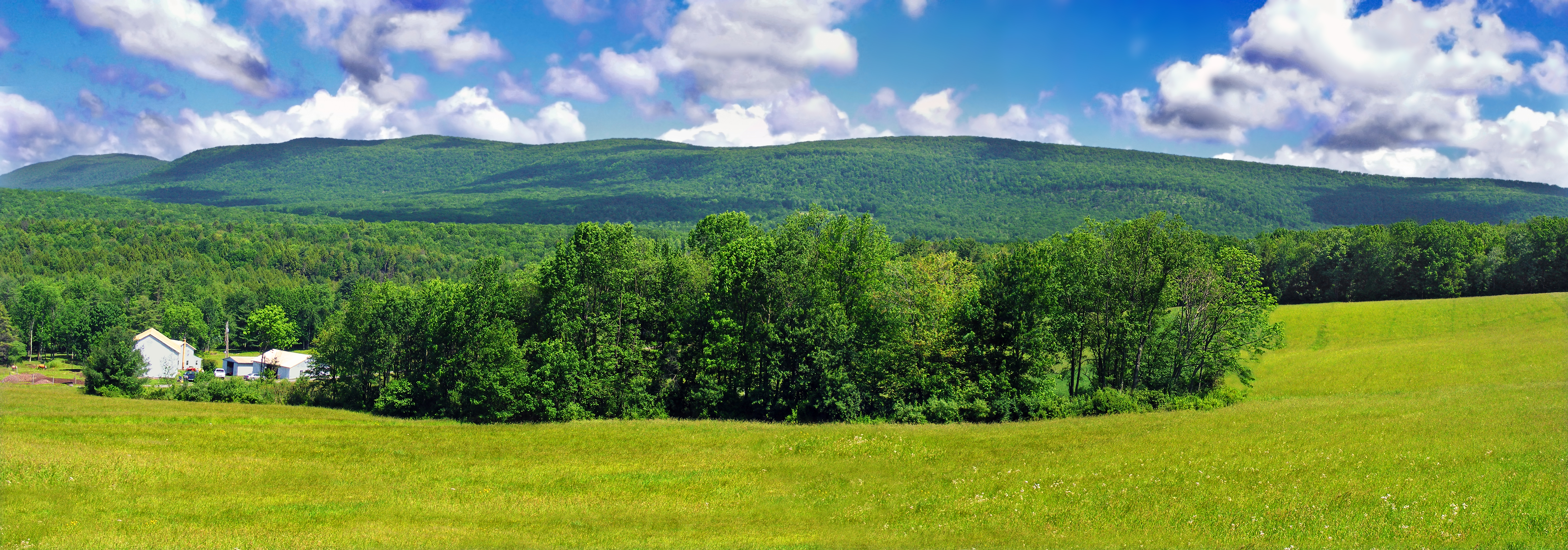
- A farm in Sugarloaf Township

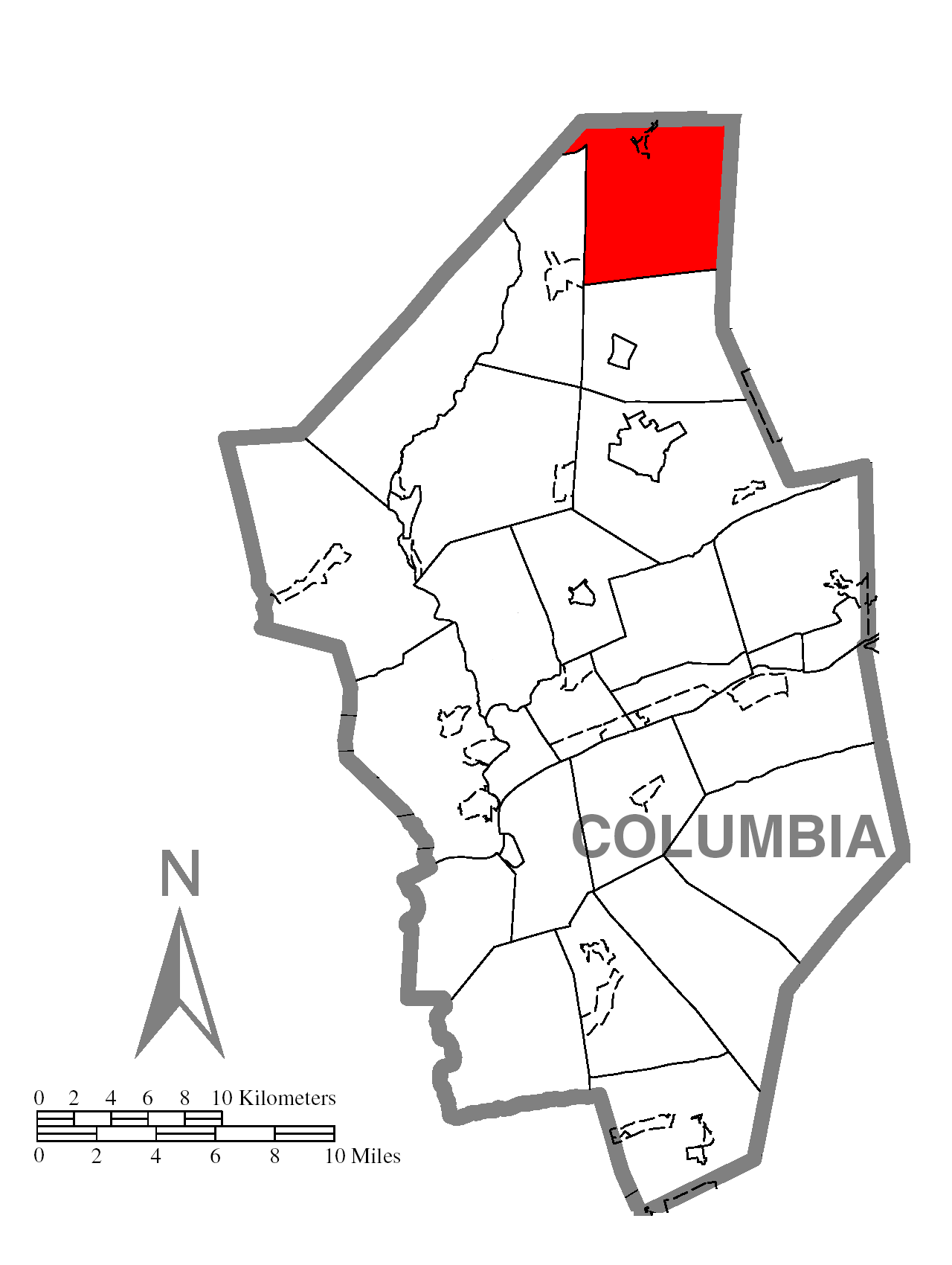
- Map of Columbia County, Pennsylvania highlighting Sugarloaf Township

- Map of Columbia County, Pennsylvania
- Country: United States
- State: Pennsylvania
- County: Columbia
- Settled: 1792
- Incorporated: 1812

Area
  - Total: 26.30 sq mi (68.12 km^{2})
  - Land: 26.14 sq mi (67.70 km^{2})
  - Water: 0.16 sq mi (0.42 km^{2})

Population (2020)
  - Total: 890 ▼
  - Estimate (2021): 894
  - Density: 34.6/sq mi (13.34/km^{2})
- Time zone: UTC-5 (Eastern (EST))
  - Summer (DST): UTC-4 (EDT)
- Area code: 570
- FIPS code: 42-037-75048

Sugarloaf Township is a township in Columbia County, Pennsylvania. It is part of Northeastern Pennsylvania.

The population was eight hundred and ninety at the time of the 2020 census.

== History ==
The Y Covered Bridge No. 156 was listed on the National Register of Historic Places in 1979.

== Geography ==
Sugarloaf Township is located in the northeast corner of Columbia County, and is bordered to the north by Sullivan County and to the east by Luzerne County. Most of the township is rolling hills, with elevations ranging from 850 to 1,300 feet (260 to 400 m), while the northern part of the township contains the southern escarpment of the Allegheny Plateau, with elevations rising to 2,341 feet (714 m) along Huckleberry Mountain in the west, to 2,250 feet (690 m) on Central Mountain to the east, and to 2,360 feet (720 m) on Red Rock Mountain in the northeastern corner.

Sugarloaf Township contains the unincorporated communities of Elk Grove, Jamison City, Central, and Grassmere Park. According to the U.S. Census Bureau, Sugarloaf Township has a total area of 26.3 square miles (68.1 km^{2}), of which 26.1 square miles (67.7 km^{2}) is land and 0.2 square miles (0.4 km^{2}), or 0.61%, is water.

West Branch Fishing Creek flows southward through the center of the township, part of the Susquehanna River watershed.

== Demographics ==
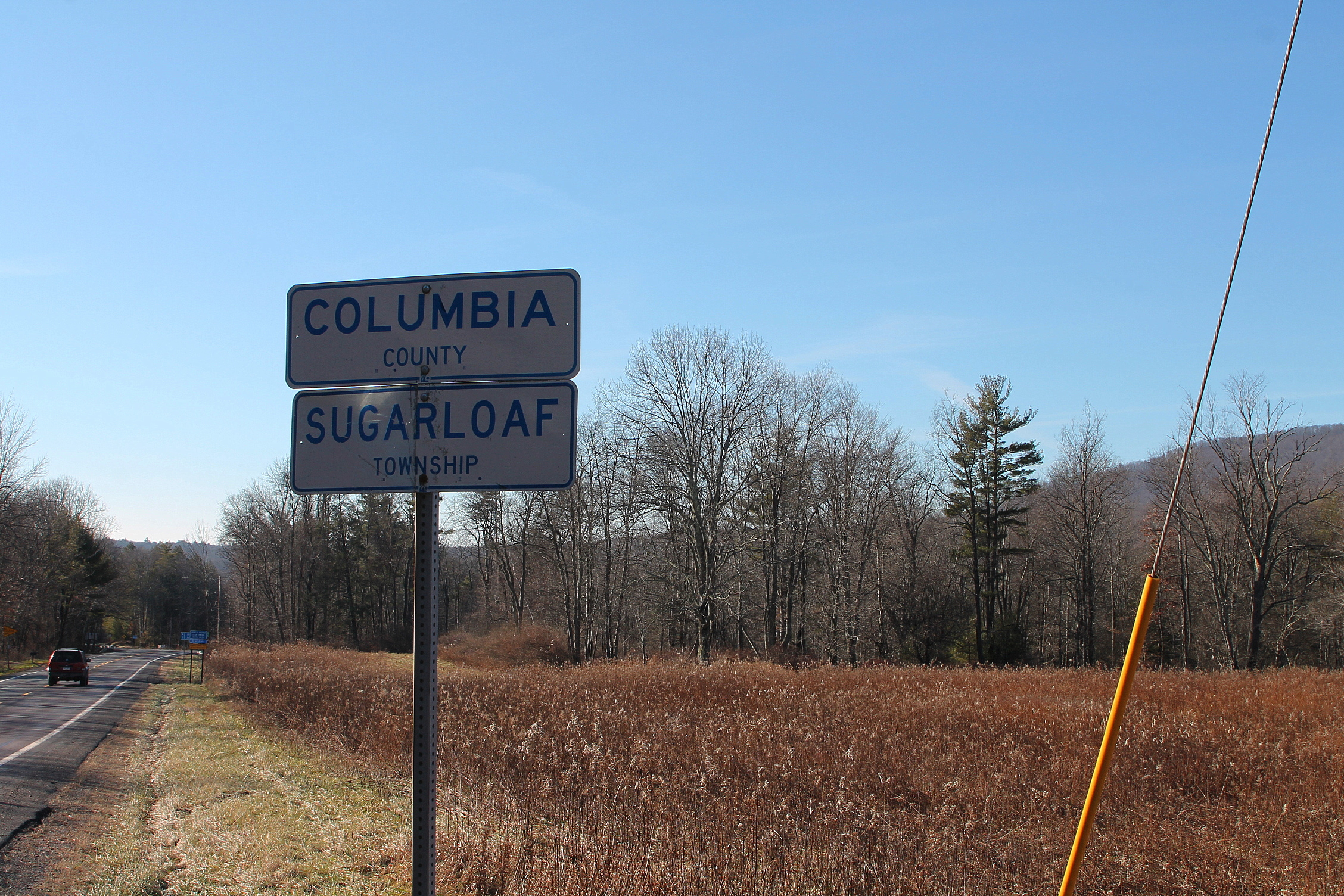
Entering Sugarloaf Township

Historical population
| Census | Pop. | Note | %± |
|---|---|---|---|
| 2010 | 913 | | — |
| 2020 | 890 | | −2.5% |
| 2021 (est.) | 894 | | 0.4% |

As of the census of 2000, there were eight hundred and eighty-five people, three hundred and seventy households and two hundred and sixty-three families residing in the township. The population density was 34.2 inhabitants per square mile (13.2/km^{2}). There were seven hundred and seventy-nine housing units at an average density of 30.1 per square mile (11.6/km^{2}).

The racial makeup of the township was 98.98% White, 0.23% African American, 0.45% Native American, 0.11% Asian, 0.11% from other races, and 0.11% from two or more races. Hispanic or Latino of any race were 0.90% of the population.

There were three hundred and seventy households, out of which 23.8% had children under the age of eighteen living with them; 59.7% were married couples living together, 7.8% had a female householder with no husband present, and 28.9% were non-families. 24.3% of all households were made up of individuals, and 10.3% had someone living alone who was sixty-five years of age or older. The average household size was 2.39 and the average family size was 2.83.

In the township, the population was spread out, with 19.2% under the age of eighteen, 8.1% from eighteen to twenty-four, 27.6% from twenty-five to forty-four, 25.5% from forty-five to sixty-four, and 19.5% who were sixty-five years of age or older. The median age was forty-three years.

For every one hundred females, there were 106.3 males. For every one hundred females aged eighteen and over, there were 108.5 males.

The median income for a household in the township was $35,521, and the median income for a family was $41,250. Males had a median income of $29,615 compared with that of $20,924 for females. The per capita income for the township was $17,444.

Roughly 4.8% of families and 5.5% of the population were below the poverty line, including 7.6% of those under age eighteen and 2.6% of those aged sixty-five or over.
