= Benninghof Run =

Stream in Pennsylvania, USA

Benninghof Run Tributary to Oil Creek
- Location within Pennsylvania Location within the United States

Location
- Country: United States
- State: Pennsylvania
- County: Venango
- Townships: Cherrytree; Cornplanter

Physical characteristics
- Source: on divide of Oil Creek and Cherrytree Run
  - location: about 0.5 miles southeast of Toonerville, Pennsylvania
  - coordinates: 41°33′45″N 079°41′22″W
  - elevation: 1,560 ft (480 m)
- Mouth: Oil Creek
  - location: about 0.25 miles upstream of Petroleum Center, Pennsylvania on Oil Creek
  - coordinates: 41°33′45″N 079°41′22″W
  - elevation: 1,070 ft (330 m)
- Length: 3.26 mi (5.25 km)
- Basin size: 2.86 square miles (7.4 km^{2})
- Discharge
  - average: 5.41 cu ft/s (0.153 m^{3}/s) at mouth with Oil Creek

Basin features
- Progression: Oil Creek → Allegheny River → Ohio River → Mississippi River → Gulf of Mexico
- River system: Allegheny River (Oil Creek)
- Tributaries
  - left: unnamed tributaries
  - right: unnamed tributaries

Benninghof Run is a 3.26 mi (5.25 km) long stream that begins on the divide between Oil Creek and Cherrytree Run in Venango County, Pennsylvania. The mouth of the creek is located in Oil Creek State Park.
