= Steuben Township, Pennsylvania =

Township in Pennsylvania, US

Coordinates: 41°42′00″N 79°52′59″W

Steuben Township, Crawford County, Pennsylvania
- Township
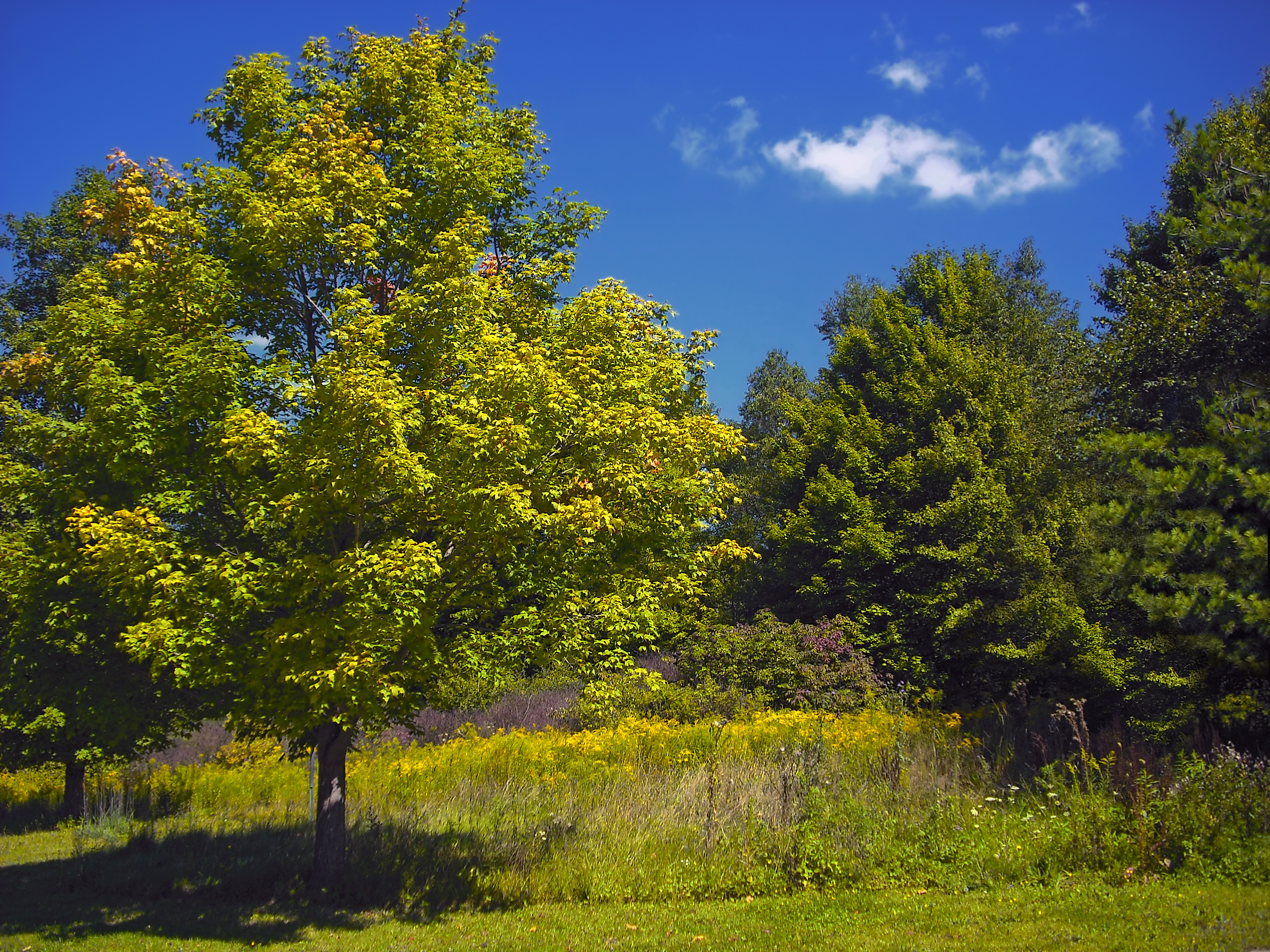
- A scene from Steuben Township

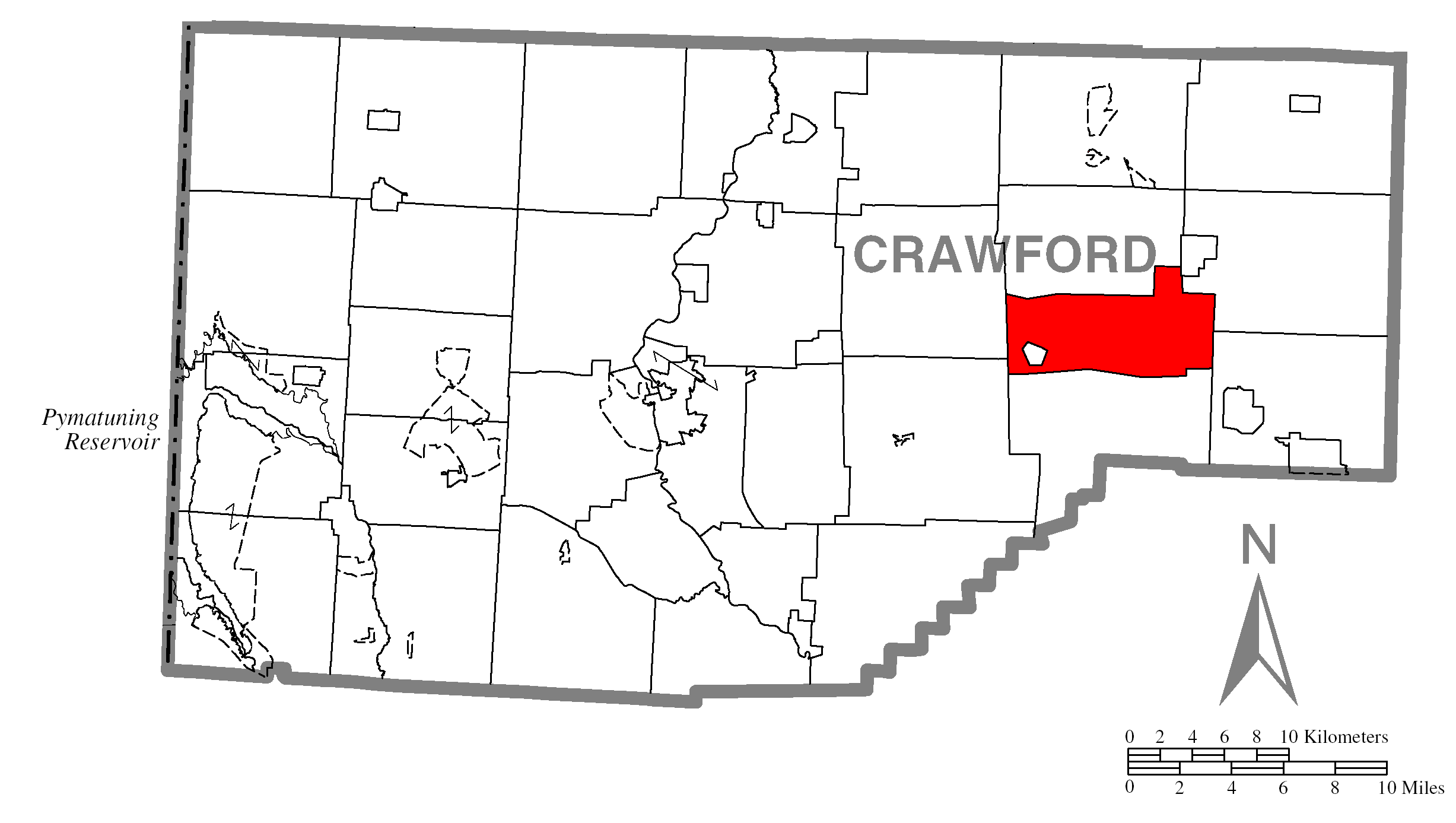
- Location of Steuben Township in Crawford County

- Location of Crawford County in Pennsylvania
- Country: United States
- State: Pennsylvania
- County: Crawford County

Area
  - Total: 24.54 sq mi (63.55 km^{2})
  - Land: 24.52 sq mi (63.50 km^{2})
  - Water: 0.019 sq mi (0.05 km^{2})
- Highest elevation (south of Steuben Corners at township line): 1,700 ft (520 m)
- Lowest elevation (Oil Creek): 1,240 ft (380 m)

Population (2020)
  - Total: 773 ▼
  - Estimate (2024): 758
  - Density: 31.7/sq mi (12.24/km^{2})
- Time zone: UTC-4 (EST)
  - Summer (DST): UTC-5 (EDT)
- Area code: 814
- FIPS code: 42-039-74016

Steuben Township is a township in Crawford County, Pennsylvania, United States. The population was 773 at the 2020 census, down from 804 at the 2010 census and 908 in 2000.

== Geography ==
Steuben township is in eastern Crawford County. The borough of Townville, a separate municipality, is surrounded by the western side of the township. According to the United States Census Bureau, the township has a total area of 24.56 square miles (63.60 km^{2}), of which 24.54 square miles (63.55 km^{2}) is land and 0.02 square miles (0.05 km^{2}), or 0.07%, is water.

=== Natural features ===
Rome Township lies at the southern terminal moraine for glaciation in northwestern Pennsylvania. The eastern half of Steuben Township is drained by Oil Creek and its tributaries, which include Marsh Run and DeWolfe Run. The western side of the township is drained by tributaries to French Creek. The lowest elevation of Steuben Township is 1,240 ft (380 m) at Mystic Park where Oil Creek flows out of the township, while the highest elevation is 1,700 ft (520 m) south of Steuben Corners at the township line with Troy Township.

== Demographics ==
Historical population
Census	Pop.	Note	%±
2000	908		—
2010	804		−11.5%
2020	773		−3.9%
2024 (est.)	758		−1.9%
U.S. Decennial Census

At the 2000 census, there were 908 people, 336 households and 237 families residing in the township. The population density was 37.0 per square mile (14.3/km^{2}). There were 413 housing units at an average density of 16.8 per square mile (6.5/km^{2}). The racial make-up of the township was 98.24% White, 0.44% African American, 0.11% Native American, 0.33% Asian, 0.33% Pacific Islander, 0.11% from other races and 0.44% from two or more races. Hispanic or Latino of any race were 0.11% of the population.

There were 336 households, of which 35.7% had children under the age of 18 living with them, 61.9% were married couples living together, 6.0% had a female householder with no husband present and 29.2% were non-families. 22.9% of all households were made up of individuals and 11.3% had someone living alone who was 65 years of age or older. The average household size was 2.70 and the average family size was 3.23.

30.4% of the population were under the age of 18, 4.7% from 18 to 24, 29.7% from 25 to 44, 20.5% from 45 to 64 and 14.6% were 65 years of age or older. The median age was 36 years. For every 100 females, there were 104.0 males. For every 100 females age 18 and over, there were 102.6 males.

The median household income was $30,568 and the median family incomewas $35,750. Males had a median income of $32,188 and females $19,773. The per capita income was $13,089. About 12.9% of families and 16.2% of the population were below the poverty line, including 16.8% of those under age 18 and 12.7% of those age 65 or over.
