= Mosey Run (Oil Creek tributary) =

Tributary to Oil Creek in Crawford County, Pennsylvania

Mosey Run Tributary to Oil Creek
- Location within Pennsylvania Location within the United States

Location
- Country: United States
- State: Pennsylvania
- County: Crawford; Erie
- Township: Bloomfield

Physical characteristics
- Source: divide between Mosey Run and South Branch French Creek
  - location: Union Township, Erie County
  - coordinates: 41°51′04″N 079°54′49″W
  - elevation: 1,665 ft (507 m)
- Mouth: Oil Creek at Lincolnville, Pennsylvania
  - location: Lincolnville, Pennsylvania
  - coordinates: 41°47′43″N 079°50′26″W
  - elevation: 1,370 ft (420 m)
- Length: 7.5 mi (12.1 km)
- Basin size: 180.95 square miles (468.7 km^{2})
- Discharge
  - average: 180.92 cu ft/s (5.123 m^{3}/s) at mouth with Oil Creek

Basin features
- Progression: Oil Creek → Allegheny River → Ohio River → Mississippi River → Gulf of Mexico
- River system: Allegheny River
- Tributaries
  - left: unnamed tributaries
  - right: unnamed tributaries
- Bridges: Rockdale Road, Wilkins Road, King Road, Brown Hill Road, Shreve Ridge Road

Mosey Run is a 7.5 mi (12.1 km) long 1st order tributary to Oil Creek in Crawford County, Pennsylvania.

== Course ==
Mosey Run rises on the South Branch French Creek divide in Union Township, Pennsylvania. Mosey Run then flows south-southeast through the Erie Drift Plain to Oil Creek at Lincolnville, Pennsylvania.

== Watershed ==
Mosey Run drains 180.95 square miles (468.7 km^{2}) of area, receives about 46.2 in/year of precipitation, has a topographic wetness index of 463.09 and is about 54% forested.

== Additional images ==
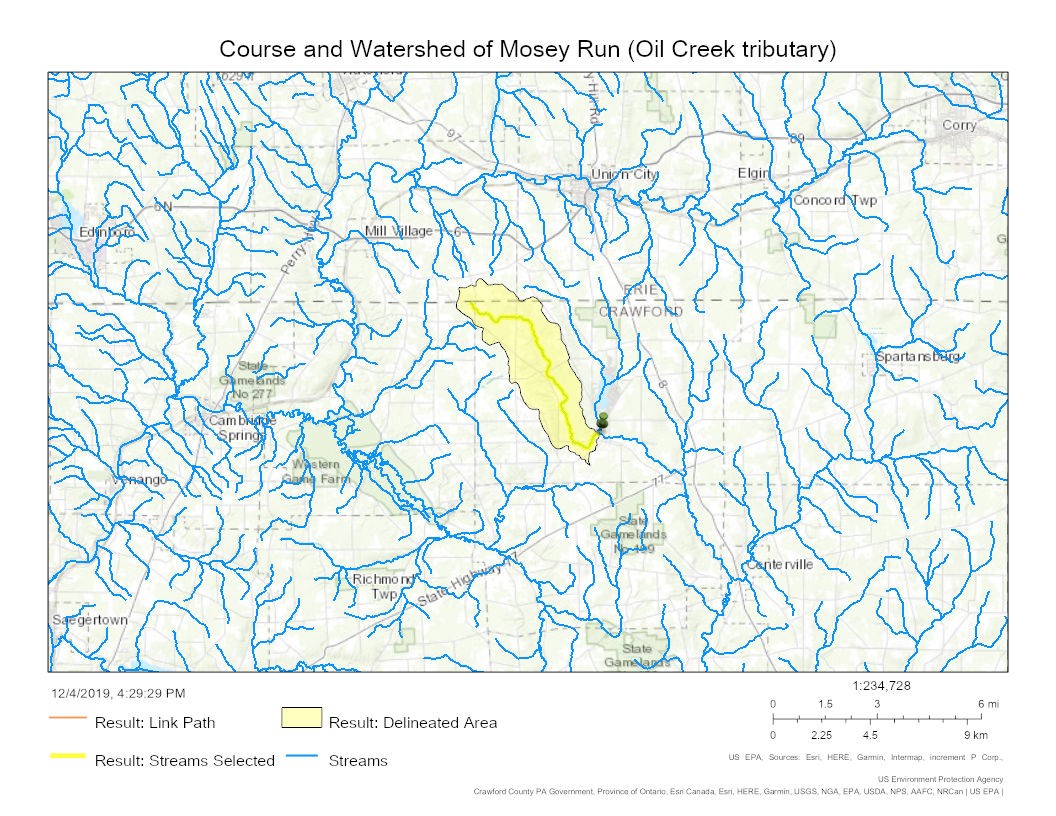
Course and Watershed of Mosey Run (Oil Creek tributary)
