= Husband Run =

Stream in Pennsylvania, USA

Husband Run Tributary to Oil Creek
- Location of Husband Run mouth Husband Run (the United States)

Location
- Country: United States
- State: Pennsylvania
- County: Venango

Physical characteristics
- Source: Cherry Run divide
  - location: about 1 mile south of Shamburg, Pennsylvania
  - coordinates: 41°34′31″N 079°36′52″W
  - elevation: 1,550 ft (470 m)
- Mouth: Oil Creek
  - location: about 1.5 miles southwest of Shamburg, Pennsylvania
  - coordinates: 41°34′21″N 079°38′48″W
  - elevation: 1,099 ft (335 m)
- Length: 1.86 mi (2.99 km)
- Basin size: 1.25 square miles (3.2 km^{2})
- Discharge
  - location: Oil Creek
  - average: 2.47 cu ft/s (0.070 m^{3}/s) at mouth with Oil Creek

Basin features
- Progression: Oil Creek → Allegheny River → Ohio River → Mississippi River → Gulf of Mexico
- River system: Allegheny River
- Tributaries
  - left: unnamed tributaries
  - right: unnamed tributaries
- Bridges: White City Road

Husband Run is a 1.86 mi (2.99 km) long 1st order tributary to Oil Creek in Venango County, Pennsylvania. This is the only of this name in the United States. Husband Run flows most of its distance through Oil Creek State Park.

== Course ==
Husband Run rises about 1 mile south of Shamburg, Pennsylvania and then flows west-southwest to join Oil Creek about 1.5 miles southwest of Shamburg.

== Watershed ==
Husband Run drains 1.86 square miles (4.8 km^{2}) of area, receives about 45.1 in/year of precipitation, has a wetness index of 404.49, and is about 96% forested.

== See also ==
- List of rivers of Pennsylvania

== Additional Maps ==
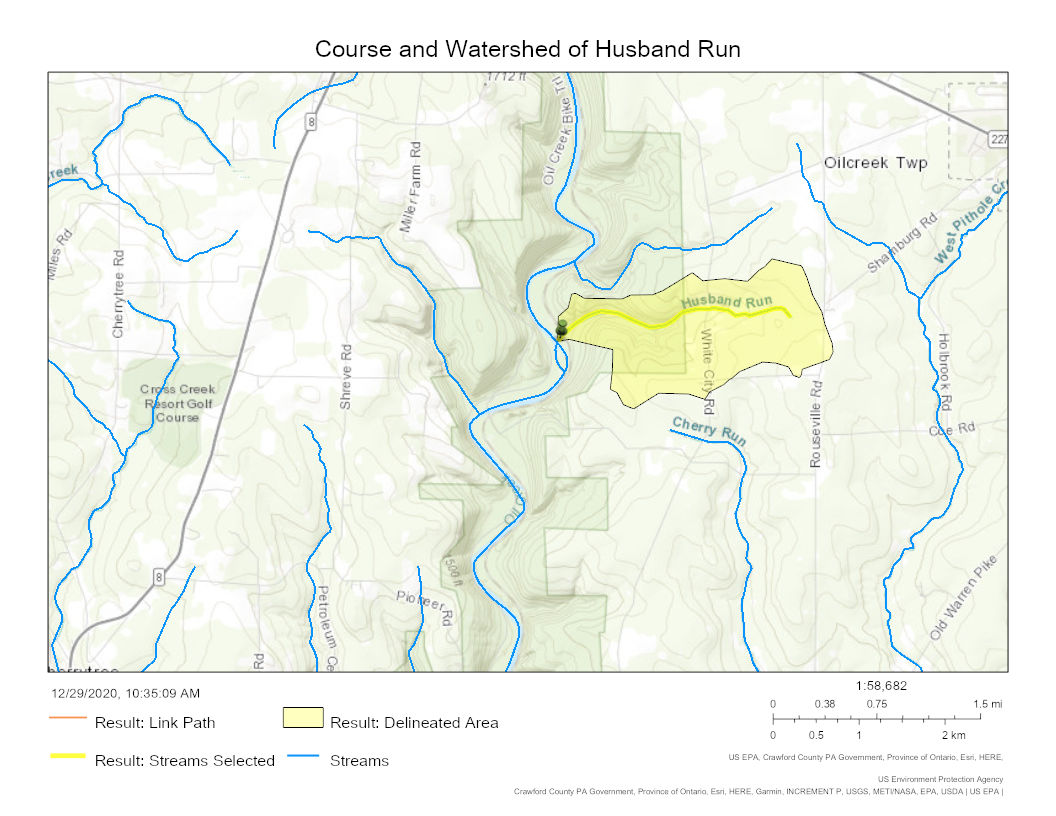
Course and Watershed of Husband Run in Venango County, Pennsylvania
