= Church Run (Oil Creek tributary) =

Stream in Crawford County, Pennsylvania, US

Church Run Tributary to Oil Creek
- Location within Pennsylvania Location within the United States

Location
- Country: United States
- State: Pennsylvania
- County: Crawford
- City: Titusville

Physical characteristics
- Source: divide between Church Run and Thompson Creek
  - location: about 2 miles north of Titusville, Pennsylvania
  - coordinates: 41°40′13″N 079°39′46″W
  - elevation: 1,565 ft (477 m)
- Mouth: Oil Creek at Titusville, Pennsylvania
  - location: Titusville, Pennsylvania
  - coordinates: 41°37′26″N 079°39′40″W
  - elevation: 1,150 ft (350 m)
- Length: 4.0 mi (6.4 km)
- Basin size: 4.0 square miles (10 km^{2})
- Discharge
  - location: Titusville, Pennsylvania
  - average: 7.64 cu ft/s (0.216 m^{3}/s) at mouth with Oil Creek

Basin features
- Progression: Oil Creek → Allegheny River → Ohio River → Mississippi River → Gulf of Mexico
- River system: Allegheny River
- Tributaries
  - left: unnamed tributaries
  - right: unnamed tributaries
- Bridges: Church Run Road (PA 89) (x2), Union Street, W Linden Street, W Spruce Street, E Hemlock Street, N Martin Street, N Drake Street, N Kerr Street, E Main Street, E Central Avenue, E Spring Street. S Brown Street

Church Run is a 4.0 mi (6.4 km) long 1st order tributary to Oil Creek in Crawford County, Pennsylvania.

== Course ==
Church Run rises on the Thompson Creek divide about 2 miles north of Titusville, Pennsylvania. Church Run then flows southwest and south to meet Oil Creek at Titusville.

== Watershed ==
Church Run drains 4.0 square miles (10 km^{2}) of area, receives about 45.0 in/year of precipitation, has a topographic wetness index of 438.82, and has an average water temperature of 7.55 °C. The watershed is 66% forested.

== Additional images ==
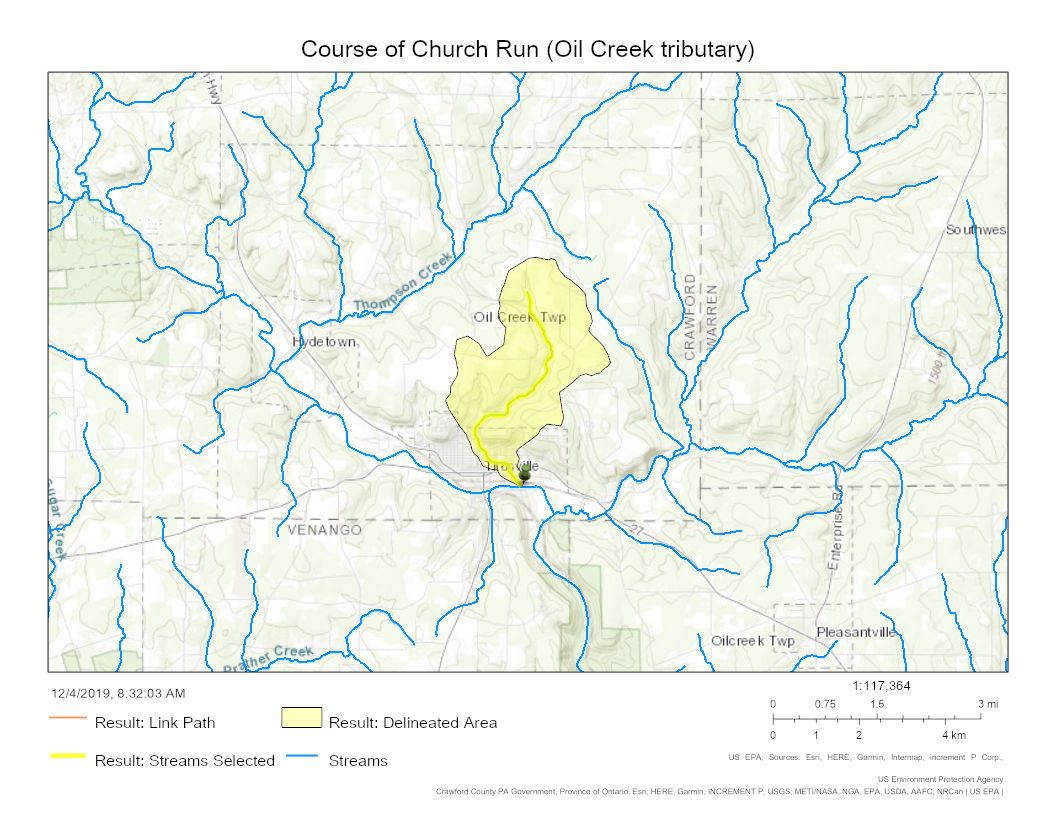
Course and Watershed of Church Run (Oil Creek tributary)
