= Oil Creek (Allegheny River tributary) =

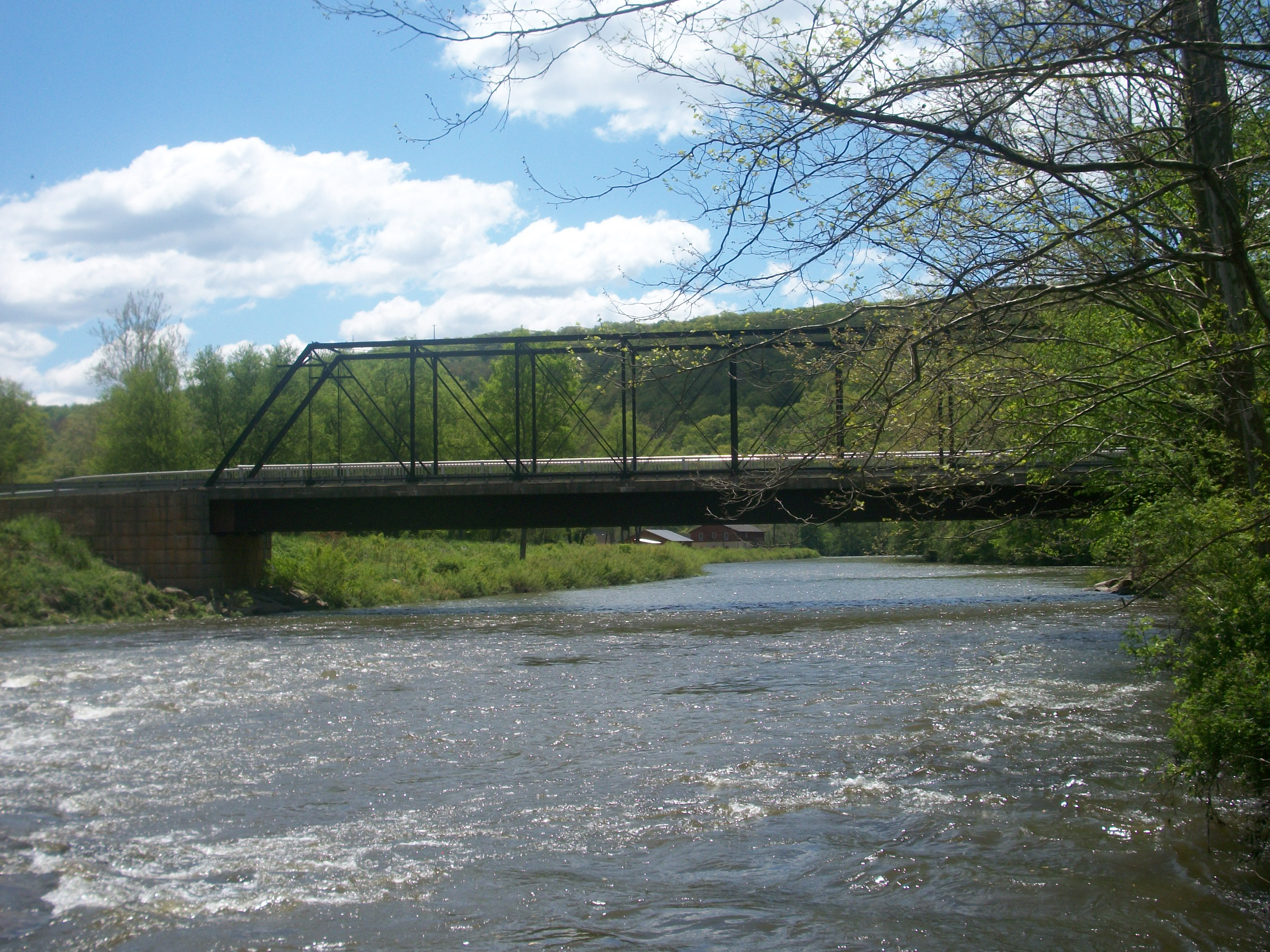
- Jersey Bridge, bridge spanning Oil Creek

- Location of the mouth of Oil Creek in Pennsylvania Oil Creek (Allegheny River tributary) (the United States)
- Etymology: "oil"

Location
- Country: United States
- State: Pennsylvania
- Counties: Crawford, Venango

Physical characteristics
- Source
  - location: Canadohta Lake, Crawford County, Pennsylvania
  - coordinates: 41°48′30″N 79°50′31″W
  - elevation: 1,389 ft (423 m)
- Mouth: Allegheny River
  - location: Oil City, Venango County, Pennsylvania
  - coordinates: 41°25′54″N 79°42′33″W
  - elevation: 985 ft (300 m)
- Length: 46.7 mi (75.2 km)
- Basin size: 319 sq mi (830 km^{2})
- Discharge
  - average: 601.55 cu ft/s (17.034 m^{3}/s) at mouth with Allegheny River

Basin features
- Progression: Allegheny River → Ohio River → Mississippi River → Gulf of Mexico
- River system: Allegheny River
- Tributaries
  - left: East Shreve Run; Bloomfield Run; East Branch Oil Creek; Thompson Creek; Church Run; Pine Creek; Husband Run; Cherry Run
  - right: West Shreve Run; Mosey Run; Marsh Run; Benninghof Run; Cherrytree Run; Cornplanter Run

Oil Creek is a 46.7-mile (75.2 km) tributary of the Allegheny River that is located in Venango and Crawford counties in the Commonwealth of Pennsylvania in the United States.

== Description ==
Oil Creek has a drainage area of 319 square miles (830 km^{2}) and joins the Allegheny at Oil City.

Attractions along the river include the Drake Well Museum and Oil Creek State Park. The stream was named after the oil that was found along its banks before the historic oil strike by Edwin Drake in Titusville, which Oil Creek flows through.

Oil Creek is popular with canoeists and fishers. The creek is rated as a beginners creek for those interested in learning how to safely use canoes and kayaks. Oil Creek is a cold water fishery with bass and trout living in its waters.

== Watershed ==
=== Tributaries ===
Tributaries of Oil Creek (Allegheny River tributary)

| Name, Bank | River Mile (km) | Watershed Area in Square Miles (km^{2}) | Average Discharge | Mouth Coordinates | Mouth Elevation | Source Coordinates | Source Elevation | % of Average Discharge | Remarks |
|---|---|---|---|---|---|---|---|---|---|
| Mouth | | 319 square miles (830 km^{2}) | 601.55 cu ft/s (17.034 m^{3}/s) | 41°48′30″N 079°50′31″W | 1,000 ft (300 m) | 41°06′51″N 79°48′15″W | 1,400 ft (430 m) | N/A | Oil Creek begins at Canadohta Lake in Crawford County and then follows a southerly path into Venango County where it meets the Allegheny River at Oil City, Pennsylvania. |
| Cornplanter Run, right bank | 1.18 mi (1.90 km) | 3.26 square miles (8.4 km^{2}) | 5.99 cu ft/s (0.170 m^{3}/s) | 41°26′39″N 079°41′55″W | 1,005 ft (306 m) | 41°28′24″N 079°44′03″W | 1,480 ft (450 m) | 1% | Cornplanter Run rises about 1.5 miles north of Oil City, Pennsylvania and then flows southeast to meet Oil Creek just upstream of Oil City. |
| Cherry Run, left bank | 3.26 mi (5.25 km) | 12.82 square miles (33.2 km^{2}) | 22.94 cu ft/s (0.650 m^{3}/s) | 41°28′04″N 079°41′34″W | 1,030 ft (310 m) | 41°33′50″N 079°37′56″W | 1,550 ft (470 m) | 3.8% | Cherry Run rises about 0.5 miles southwest of East Shamburg, Pennsylvania and flows southwest to meet Oil Creek just west of Rouseville, Pennsylvania. |
| Cherrytree Run, right bank | 4.24 mi (6.82 km) | 16.94 square miles (43.9 km^{2}) | 30.45 cu ft/s (0.862 m^{3}/s) | 41°28′52″N 079°41′41″W | 1,048 ft (319 m) | 41°34′41″N 079°42′29″W | 1,540 ft (470 m) | 5.1% | Cherrytree Run rises about 0.5 miles west of Toonerville, Pennsylvania and then flows south to meet Oil Creek at Rynd Farm, Pennsylvania. |
| Benninghof Run, right bank | 7.86 mi (12.65 km) | 2.86 square miles (7.4 km^{2}) | 5.41 cu ft/s (0.153 m^{3}/s) | 41°33′57″N 079°41′01″W | 1,070 ft (330 m) | 41°33′45″N 079°41′22″W | 1,560 ft (480 m) | < 1% | Benninghof Run rises about 0.5 miles southeast of Toonerville, Pennsylvania and then flows southeast to meet Oil Creek just upstream of Petroleum Center, Pennsylvania. |
| Husband Run, left bank | 1.86 mi (2.99 km) | 1.25 square miles (3.2 km^{2}) | 2.47 cu ft/s (0.070 m^{3}/s) | 41°34′31″N 079°36′52″W | 1,550 ft (470 m) | 41°34′21″N 079°38′48″W | 1,099 ft (335 m) | <1% | Husband Run rises about 1 mile south of Shamburg and then flows west-southwest to meet Oil Creek about 1.5 miles southwest of Shamburg. |
| Pine Creek, left bank | 17.50 mi (28.16 km) | 85.68 square miles (221.9 km^{2}) | 151.0 cu ft/s (4.28 m^{3}/s) | 41°37′05″N 079°39′10″W | 1,150 ft (350 m) | 41°42′54″N 079°30′56″W | 1,670 ft (510 m) | 25.0% | Pine Creek rises near Excelsior Corners, Pennsylvania in Warren County and then flows southwesterly to meet Oil Creek just downstream of Titusville, Pennsylvania. |
| Church Run, left bank | 18.18 mi (29.26 km) | 4.03 square miles (10.4 km^{2}) | 7.64 cu ft/s (0.216 m^{3}/s) | 41°37′26″N 079°39′40″W | 1,150 ft (350 m) | 41°40′13″N 079°39′46″W | 1,565 ft (477 m) | 1.3% | Church Run rises about 2 miles north of Titusville, Pennsylvania and then flows south to meet Oil Creek at Titusville. |
| Thompson Creek, left bank | 22.74 mi (36.60 km) | 35.92 square miles (93.0 km^{2}) | 66.43 cu ft/s (1.881 m^{3}/s) | 41°38′55″N 079°43′54″W | 1,240 ft (380 m) | 41°40′32″N 079°33′12″W | 1,600 ft (490 m) | 11.0% | Thompson Creek rises about 0.5 miles E of Shelmadine Springs and then flows southwest to meet Oil Creek at Hydetown, Pennsylvania. |
| Marsh Run, right bank | 27.64 mi (44.48 km) | 8.78 square miles (22.7 km^{2}) | 16.43 cu ft/s (0.465 m^{3}/s) | 41°41′05″N 079°46′59″W | 1,250 ft (380 m) | 41°43′30″N 079°48′12″W | 1,600 ft (490 m) | 2.7% | Marsh Run rises near McGinnet Corners, Pennsylvania and then flows southeast to meet Oil Creek at Tryonville, Pennsylvania. |
| East Branch Oil Creek, left bank | 32.86 mi (52.88 km) | 59.81 square miles (154.9 km^{2}) | 110.1 cu ft/s (3.12 m^{3}/s) | 41°44′05″N 079°45′59″W | 1,287 ft (392 m) | 41°49′29″N 079°41′07″W | 1,441 ft (439 m) | 18.3% | East Branch Oil Creek starts at Clear Lake in Spartansburg, Pennsylvania and then flows generally southwest to meet Oil Creek at Centerville, Pennsylvania. |
| Bloomfield Run, left bank | 37.16 mi (59.80 km) | 9.98 square miles (25.8 km^{2}) | 19.09 cu ft/s (0.541 m^{3}/s) | 41°46′41″N 079°47′35″W | 1,310 ft (400 m) | 41°49′41″N 079°48′37″W | 1,560 ft (480 m) | 3.2% | Bloomfield Run rises in Bloomfield Township, Pennsylvania and then flows southeast to meet Oil Creek at Riceville, Pennsylvania. |
| Mosey Run, right bank | 40.58 mi (65.31 km) | 8.58 square miles (22.2 km^{2}) | 16.85 cu ft/s (0.477 m^{3}/s) | 41°47′43″N 079°50′26″W | 1,370 ft (420 m) | 41°51′04″N 079°54′49″W | 1,580 ft (480 m) | 2.8% | Mosey Run rises near the Erie County line about 1 mile northeast of Sturgis Corners, Pennsylvania. It then flows southeasterly to meet Oil Creek at Lincolnville, Pennsylvania. |
| East Shreve Run, left bank | 42.24 mi (67.98 km) | 3.03 square miles (7.8 km^{2}) | 6.10 cu ft/s (0.173 m^{3}/s) | 41°49′00″N 079°50′00″W | 1,389 ft (423 m) | 41°51′39″N 079°50′26″W | 1,575 ft (480 m) | 1.0% | East Shreve Run rises in Union Township, Erie County and then flows south to Lake Canadohta, which is considered the start of Oil Creek. |
| West Shreve Run, right bank | 42.42 mi (68.27 km) | 3.8 square miles (9.8 km^{2}) | 7.65 cu ft/s (0.217 m^{3}/s) | 41°49′09″N 079°50′18″W | 1,389 ft (423 m) | 41°51′22″N 079°53′09″W | 1,630 ft (500 m) | 1.3% | West Shreve Run rises south of Hinckley Corners and flows south to Lake Canadohta, which is considered the start of Oil Creek. |

== See also ==
- List of rivers of Pennsylvania
- List of tributaries of the Allegheny River
- Pennsylvania oil rush
