= Bloomfield Township, Crawford County, Pennsylvania =

Township in Pennsylvania, US

Coordinates: 41°48′00″N 79°52′59″W

- Township
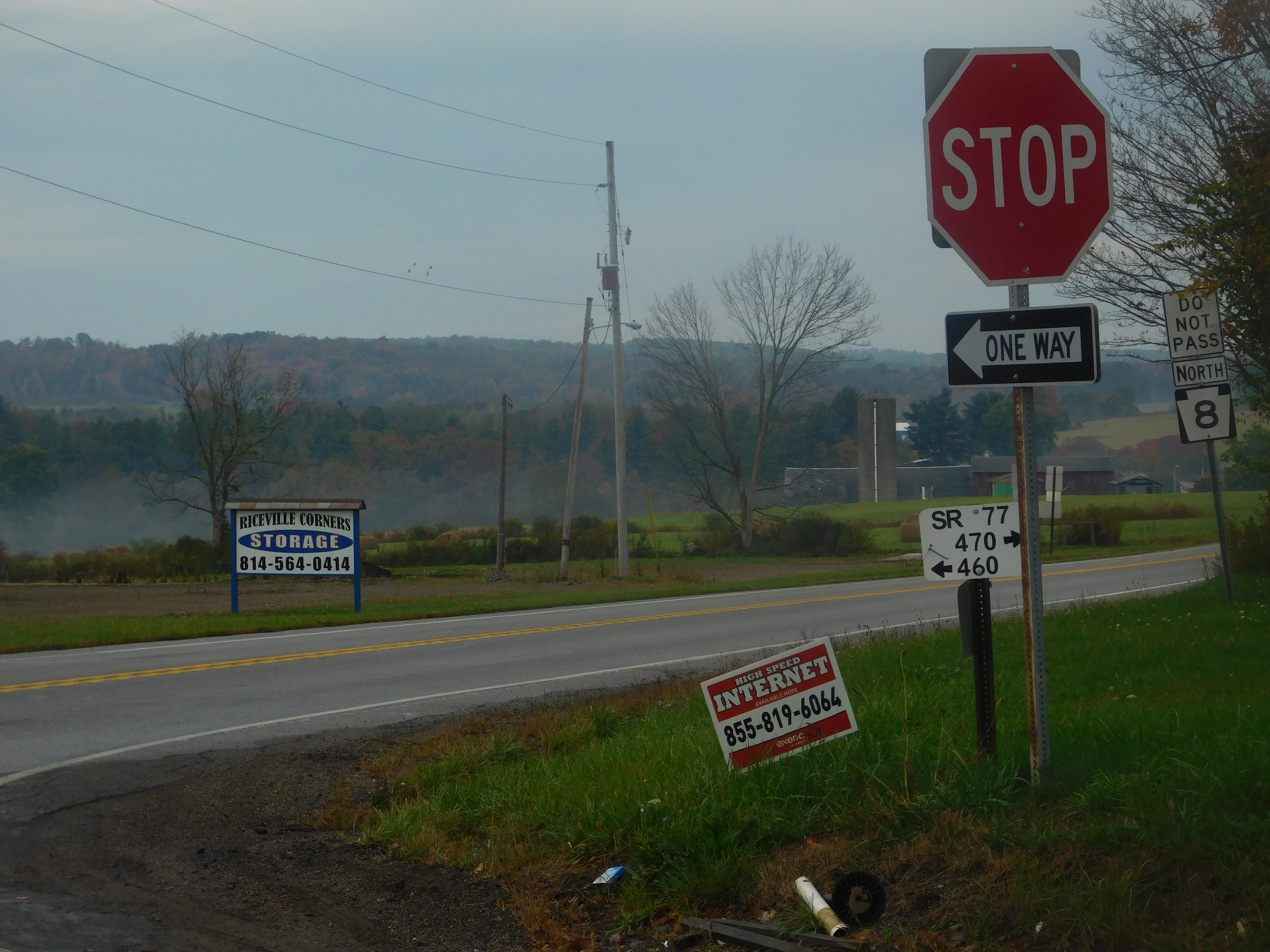
- PA 8 northbound from the PA 77 intersection

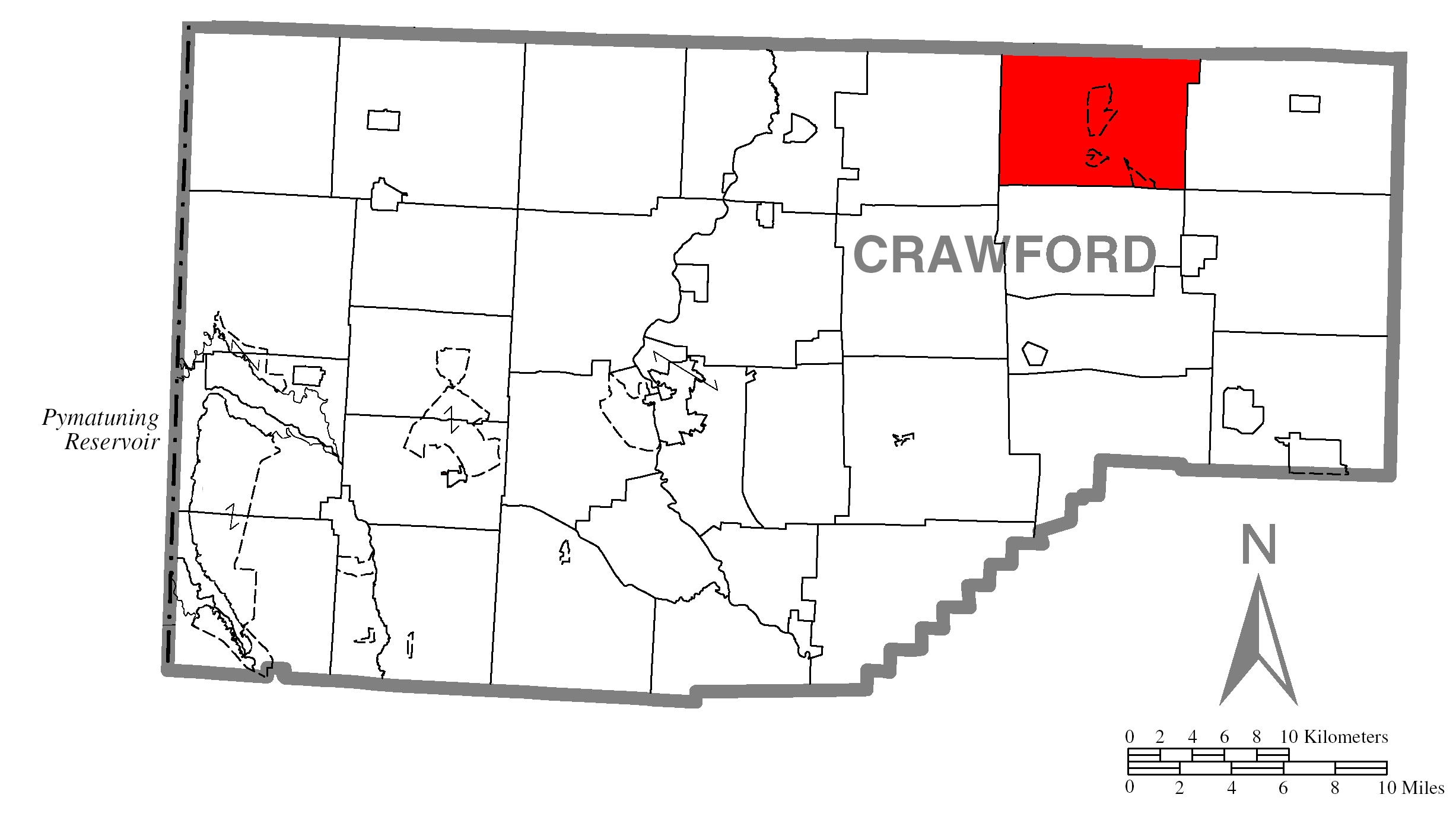
- Location of Bloomfield Township in Crawford County

- Location of Crawford County in Pennsylvania
- Country: United States
- State: Pennsylvania
- County: Crawford County

Area
  - Total: 38.24 sq mi (99.04 km^{2})
  - Land: 37.92 sq mi (98.20 km^{2})
  - Water: 0.33 sq mi (0.85 km^{2})
- Highest elevation (Shreve Ridge near Crawford-Erie County line): 1,710 ft (520 m)
- Lowest elevation (Oil Creek at Township line near Riceville, Pennsylvania): 1,310 ft (400 m)

Population (2020)
  - Total: 1,861
  - Estimate (2024): 1,833
  - Density: 49.1/sq mi (18.95/km^{2})
- Time zone: UTC-4 (EST)
  - Summer (DST): UTC-5 (EDT)
- Area code: 814
- FIPS code: 42-039-07032
- Website: bloomfieldtwppa.com

Bloomfield Township is a township in Crawford County, Pennsylvania, United States. The population was 1,861 at the 2020 census.

== History ==
Bloomfield Township was cut out of Oil Creek Township in 1811 and named for Thomas Bloomfield, an early settler in the area. The boundaries as they are known to exist were formed in 1829.

== Geography ==
Bloomfield Township is in northeastern Crawford County, bordered to the north by Erie County. According to the United States Census Bureau, the township has a total area of 38.2 square miles (99.0 km^{2}), of which 37.9 square miles (98.2 km^{2}) is land and 0.31 square miles (0.8 km^{2}), or 0.86%, is water. The township includes the unincorporated communities of Lincolnville, Riceville, and Canadohta Lake, a residential community around the lake of the same name.

=== Natural features ===
Geologic Province: Northwestern Glaciated Plateau
Lowest Elevation: 1,310 ft (400 m) where Oil Creek flows southward from the township.
Highest Elevation: 1,710 ft (520 m) in Shreve Ridge at the Crawford-Erie county line
Places of high elevation: Shreve Ridge 1,710 ft (520 m) and Dutch Hill 1,560 ft (480 m)
Major Rivers/Streams and Watersheds: Oil Creek, Muddy Creek, and South Branch French Creek
Minor Rivers/Streams and Watersheds:

- Oil Creek tributaries (Most of the township): Mosey Run, West Shreve Run, East Shreve Run and Bloomfield Run, and its tributary, Pine Hollow Run
- Muddy Creek tributaries (southwestern part of township): Federal Run and its tributary, Little Federal Run
- South Branch French Creek tributaries (extreme northeastern part of township): Hungry Run and unnamed tributaries

Lakes and Waterbodies: Lake Canadohta (Glacial Lake)
Biological Diversity Areas: Lake Canadohta BDA and Little Federal Run Headwaters BDA

== Demographics ==
Historical population
Census	Pop.	Note	%±
2000	2,051		—
2010	1,919		−6.4%
2020	1,861		−3.0%
2024 (est.)	1,833		−1.5%
U.S. Decennial Census

As of the census of 2000, there were 2,051 people, 757 households, and 560 families residing in the township. The population density was 54.0 inhabitants per square mile (20.8/km^{2}). There were 1,467 housing units at an average density of 38.6 per square mile (14.9/km^{2}). The racial makeup of the township was 99.12% White, 0.24% African American, 0.05% Native American, 0.05% Asian, and 0.54% from two or more races. Hispanic or Latino of any race were 0.34% of the population.

There were 757 households, out of which 32.0% had children under the age of 18 living with them, 62.7% were married couples living together, 6.3% had a female householder with no husband present, and 26.0% were non-families. 20.6% of all households were made up of individuals, and 7.7% had someone living alone who was 65 years of age or older. The average household size was 2.68 and the average family size was 3.08.

In the township the population was spread out, with 27.6% under the age of 18, 7.3% from 18 to 24, 28.2% from 25 to 44, 23.5% from 45 to 64, and 13.4% who were 65 years of age or older. The median age was 36 years. For every 100 females, there were 104.7 males. For every 100 females age 18 and over, there were 106.5 males.

The median income for a household in the township was $36,307, and the median income for a family was $41,250. Males had a median income of $30,639 versus $22,250 for females. The per capita income for the township was $15,303. About 8.0% of families and 13.3% of the population were below the poverty line, including 16.8% of those under age 18 and 12.0% of those age 65 or over.
