= Townville, Pennsylvania =

Borough in Pennsylvania, US

- Borough
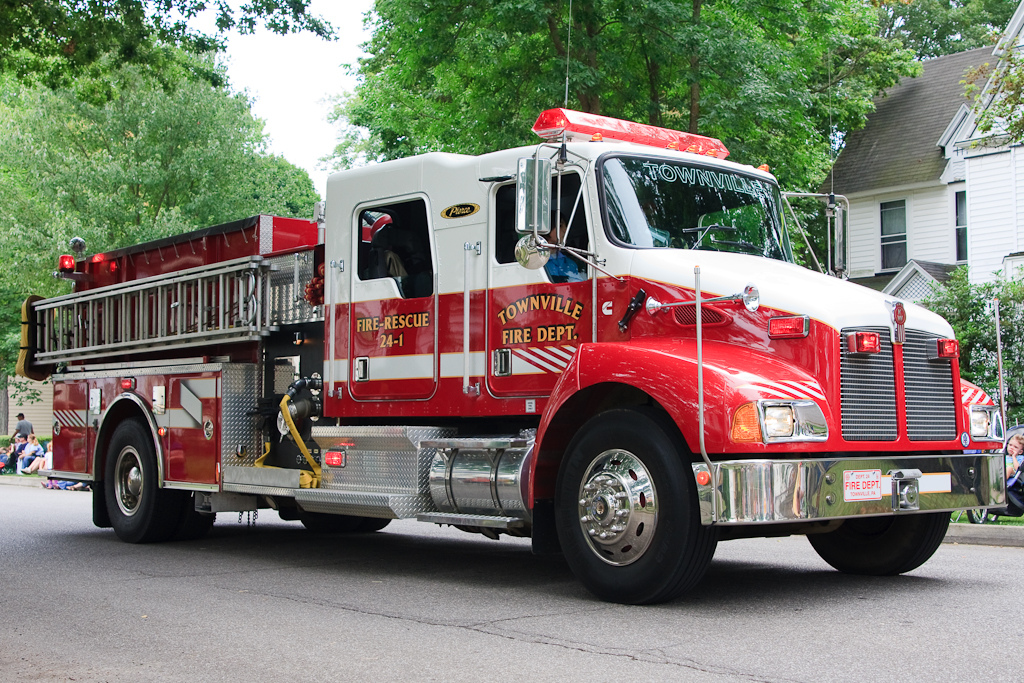
- Townville Fire-Rescue 24-1 seen at the 2011 Titusville Oil Parade

- Location of Townville in Crawford County, Pennsylvania.

- Location of Townville in Pennsylvania
- Coordinates: 41°40′47″N 79°52′54″W
- Country: United States
- State: Pennsylvania
- County: Crawford County
- Founded: 1831

Area
  - Total: 0.51 sq mi (1.32 km^{2})
  - Land: 0.51 sq mi (1.32 km^{2})
  - Water: 0 sq mi (0.00 km^{2})
- Elevation (middle of borough): 1,411 ft (430 m)
- Highest elevation (west side of boundary): 1,500 ft (460 m)
- Lowest elevation (Muddy Creek): 1,370 ft (420 m)

Population (2020)
  - Total: 326
  - Estimate (2022): 322
  - Density: 604.7/sq mi (233.49/km^{2})
- Time zone: UTC-4 (EST)
  - Summer (DST): UTC-5 (EDT)
- ZIP: 16360
- Area code: 814
- FIPS code: 42-77232

Townville is a borough in Crawford County, Pennsylvania, United States. The population was 326 at the 2020 census, up from 323 at the 2010 census.

== History ==
Townville was founded in 1824 by Noah Town, and named for him.

=== Sawmills ===
Thanks to its high banks along Muddy Creek, Townville saw many of its first settlers create saw mills, damming the creek and using the water fall to power their operations. Among these millers were Arthur Lamb, Ransom Kingsley, John Baker, Noah Town (who built his mill in 1833), Joseph Town, and Ebenezer Smith. These millers would saw lumber brought to them, receiving their payment by splitting the resulting lumber. Sold lumber was typically brought east to Oil Creek, where it was then rafted to the Allegheny River to reach Pittsburgh.

After oil was struck in Titusville in 1859, kicking off the oil boom, Noah Town, who was most active in selling lumber, sold oak staves for the making of oil barrels.

== Geography ==
Townville is located in eastern Crawford County at 41°40′47″N 79°52′54″W (41.679679, –79.881731). It is surrounded by Steuben Township, a separate municipality.

Pennsylvania Route 408 passes through the borough, leading east 8 miles (13 km) to Hydetown and northwest 14 miles (23 km) to Cambridge Springs. Meadville, the county seat, is 15 miles (24 km) to the west of Townville via PA 408, Lyona Road, and PA 77.

According to the United States Census Bureau, Townville has a total area of 0.51 square miles (1.33 km^{2}), all land.

=== Natural features ===
The borough is in a valley at the height of land between north-flowing Muddy Creek and south-flowing Sugar Creek, both tributaries of French Creek and part of the Allegheny River watershed. The lowest elevation in Townville is 1,370 ft (420 m) on the southern boundary at the wetland that is drained by Muddy Creek and Sugar Creek. The highest elevation is 1,500 ft (460 m) on the western boundary.

== Culture ==
Townville hosts a small rural community with a large agricultural population. Townville has three churches: Townville United Methodist Church, Townville Baptist Church, and Abundant Life Christian Fellowship.

=== Old Home Days ===
Townville Borough and surrounding municipalities come together for one weekend each July to support the local fire department through Townville Old Home Days, featuring events such as lawn tractor pulls, a children's frog jump, outhouse racing, fire department water battles, and a parade. The parade historically takes place Saturday morning of the Old Home Days weekend.

== Demographics ==
Historical population
Census	Pop.	Note	%±
1860	132		—
1870	280		112.1%
1880	610		117.9%
1890	358		−41.3%
1900	327		−8.7%
1910	317		−3.1%
1920	272		−14.2%
1930	269		−1.1%
1940	294		9.3%
1950	351		19.4%
1960	361		2.8%
1970	349		−3.3%
1980	364		4.3%
1990	358		−1.6%
2000	306		−14.5%
2010	323		5.6%
2020	326		0.9%
2022 (est.)	322	▼	−1.2%

As of the census of 2000, there were 306 people, 119 households, and 94 families residing in the borough. The population density was 535.3 inhabitants per square mile (206.7/km^{2}). There were 125 housing units at an average density of 218.7 per square mile (84.4/km^{2}). The racial makeup of the borough was 99.02% White, 0.33% Asian, 0.33% from other races, and 0.33% from two or more races. Hispanic or Latino of any race were 0.33% of the population.

There were 119 households, out of which 34.5% had children under the age of 18 living with them, 70.6% were married couples living together, 7.6% had a female householder with no husband present, and 20.2% were non-families. 17.6% of all households were made up of individuals, and 7.6% had someone living alone who was 65 years of age or older. The average household size was 2.57 and the average family size was 2.93.

In the borough the population was spread out, with 26.8% under the age of 18, 3.6% from 18 to 24, 27.5% from 25 to 44, 22.5% from 45 to 64, and 19.6% who were 65 years of age or older. The median age was 39 years. For every 100 females there were 97.4 males. For every 100 females age 18 and over, there were 88.2 males.

The median income for a household in the borough was $35,833, and the median income for a family was $37,500. Males had a median income of $30,417 versus $21,458 for females. The per capita income for the borough was $18,095. None of the families and 1.4% of the population were living below the poverty line, including no under eighteens and 3.3% of those over 64.

== Notable people ==
- R. A. Mihailoff, actor and wrestler
- Cameron Carpenter, organist and composer
- Jeannie Seely, singer, songwriter, record producer, author
