= West Shreve Run =

Tributary to Oil Creek in Crawford County, Pennsylvania

West Shreve Run Tributary to Oil Creek
- Location within Pennsylvania Location within the United States

Location
- Country: United States
- State: Pennsylvania
- County: Crawford; Erie
- Township: Bloomfield; Union

Physical characteristics
- Source: divide between West Shreve Run and South Branch French Creek
  - location: about 1 mile south of Hinckley Corners, Pennsylvania
  - coordinates: 41°51′22″N 079°53′09″W
  - elevation: 1,630 ft (500 m)
- Mouth: Lake Canadohta
  - location: Lake Canadohta
  - coordinates: 41°49′09″N 079°50′18″W
  - elevation: 1,389 ft (423 m)
- Length: 4.06 mi (6.53 km)
- Basin size: 3.8 square miles (9.8 km^{2})
- Discharge
  - average: 7.65 cu ft/s (0.217 m^{3}/s) at mouth with Oil Creek (Lake Canadohta)

Basin features
- Progression: Oil Creek → Allegheny River → Ohio River → Mississippi River → Gulf of Mexico
- River system: Allegheny River (Oil Creek)
- Tributaries
  - left: unnamed tributaries
  - right: unnamed tributaries
- Bridges: Shreve Ridge Road, Old Valley Road (x2), Lincolnville Road

West Shreve Run is a 4.06 mi (6.53 km) long tributary to Lake Canadohta (Oil Creek) in Crawford County, Pennsylvania. The watershed is about 50% forested and 43% agricultural. The rest is of other uses.

== Course ==
West Shreve Run rises on the South Branch French Creek divide about 1 mile south of Hinckley Corners, Pennsylvania. West Shreve Run then flows south through the Erie Drift Plain to Oil Creek (Lake Canadohta).

== Watershed ==
West Shreve Run drains 3.8 square miles (9.8 km^{2}) of area, receives about 46.4 in/year of precipitation, has a topographic wetness index of 461.04 and is about 50% forested.

== Additional images ==
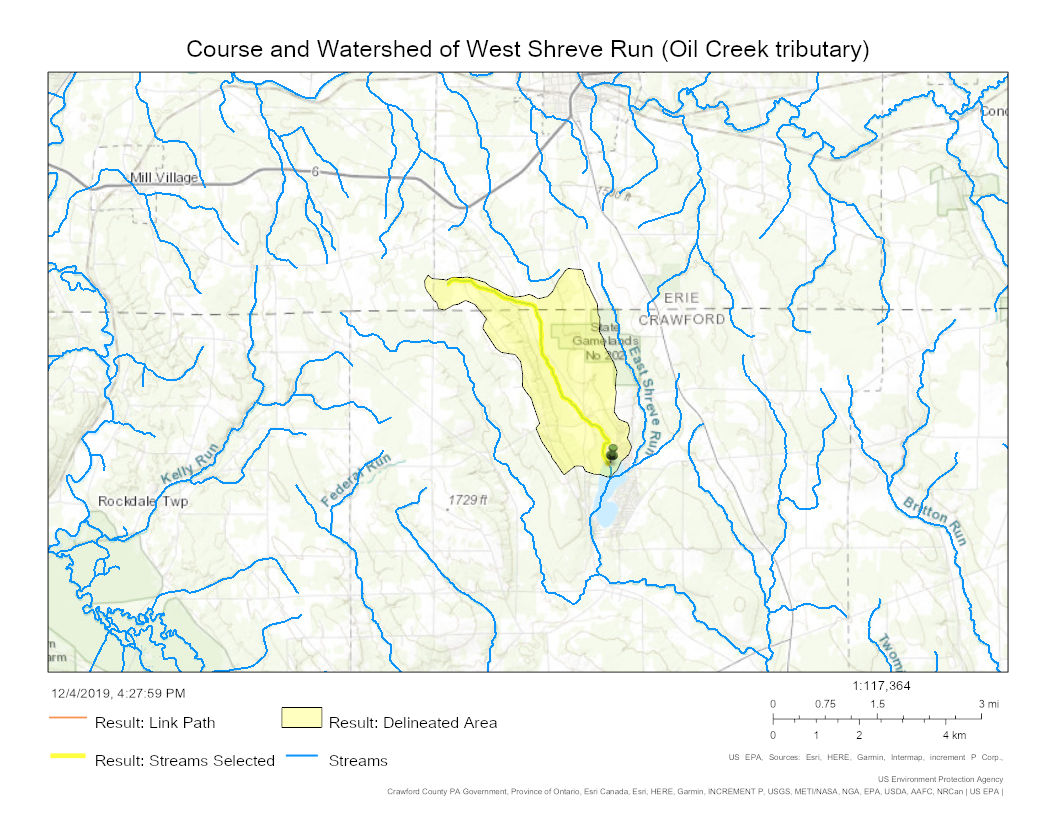
Course and Watershed of West Shreve Run (Oil Creek tributary)
