= East Shreve Run =

Tributary to Oil Creek in Crawford County, Pennsylvania

East Shreve Run Tributary to Oil Creek
- Location within Pennsylvania Location within the United States

Location
- Country: United States
- State: Pennsylvania
- County: Crawford; Erie
- Township: Bloomfield

Physical characteristics
- Source: divide between East Shreve Run and South Branch French Creek
  - location: Union Township, Erie County
  - coordinates: 41°49′00″N 079°50′00″W
  - elevation: 1,575 ft (480 m)
- Mouth: Lake Canadohta
  - location: Lake Canadohta
  - coordinates: 41°49′00″N 079°50′00″W{
  - elevation: 1,389 ft (423 m)
- Length: 3.42 mi (5.50 km)
- Basin size: 3.03 square miles (7.8 km^{2})
- Discharge
  - average: 6.10 cu ft/s (0.173 m^{3}/s) at mouth with Oil Creek

Basin features
- Progression: Oil Creek → Allegheny River → Ohio River → Mississippi River → Gulf of Mexico
- River system: Allegheny River
- Tributaries
  - left: unnamed tributaries
  - right: unnamed tributaries
- Bridges: State Game Land Road, Mt Pleasant Road

East Shreve Run is a 3.42 mi (5.50 km) long tributary to Lake Canadohta (Oil Creek) in Crawford County, Pennsylvania. The watershed is about 43% forested and 50% agricultural. The rest is of other uses.

== Course ==
East Shreve Run rises on the South Branch French Creek divide in Union Township, Pennsylvania. East Shreve Run then flows south through the Erie Drift Plain to Oil Creek at Lake Canadohta, Pennsylvania.

== Watershed ==
East Shreve Run drains 3.03 square miles (7.8 km^{2}) of area, receives about 46.4 in/year of precipitation, has a topographic wetness index of 483.63 and is about 45% forested.

== Additional images ==
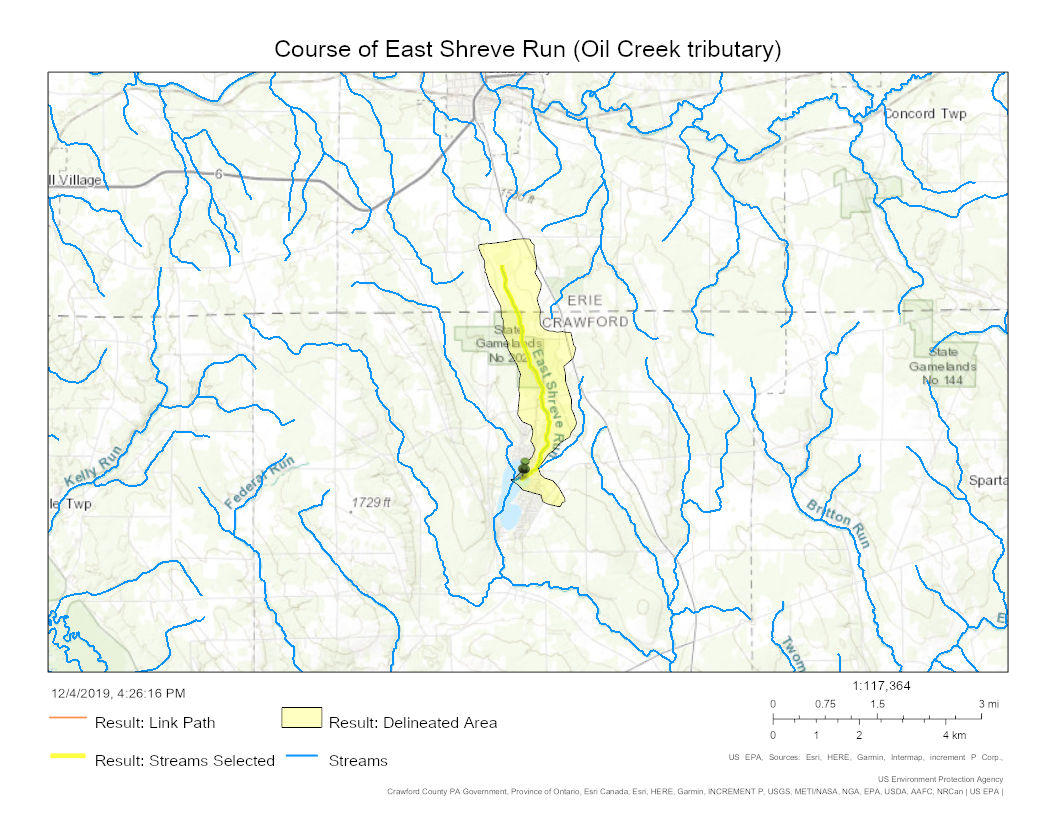
Course of East Shreve Run (Oil Creek tributary)

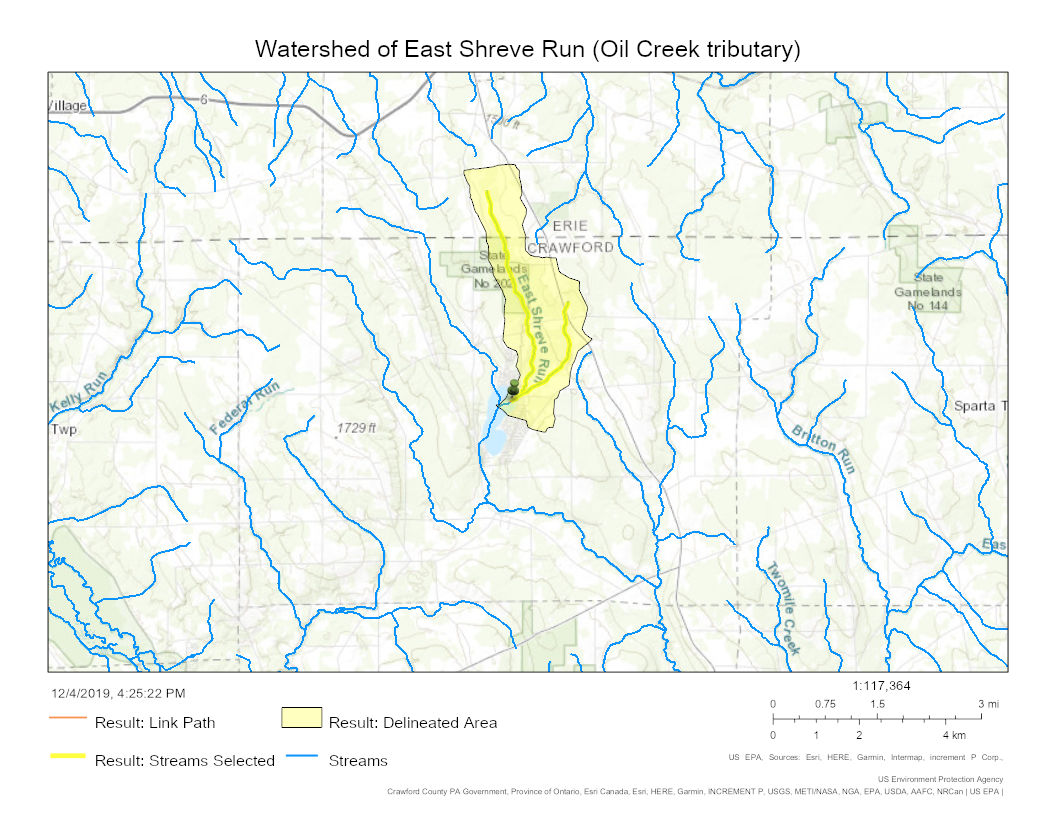
Watershed of East Shreve Run (Oil Creek tributary)
