= Marsh Run (Oil Creek tributary) =

Tributary to Oil Creek in Crawford County, Pennsylvania

Marsh Run Tributary to Oil Creek
- Location within Pennsylvania Location within the United States

Location
- Country: United States
- State: Pennsylvania
- County: Crawford
- City: Hydetown

Physical characteristics
- Source: divide between Marsh Run and Muddy Creek
  - location: near McGinnet Corners, Pennsylvania
  - coordinates: 41°43′30″N 079°48′12″W
  - elevation: 1,600 ft (490 m)
- Mouth: about 0.5 miles south of Tryonville, Pennsylvania
  - location: Tryonville, Pennsylvania
  - coordinates: 41°41′05″N 079°46′59″W
  - elevation: 1,250 ft (380 m)
- Length: 4.0 mi (6.4 km)
- Basin size: 4.0 square miles (10 km^{2})
- Discharge
  - location: Hydetown, Pennsylvania
  - average: 16.43 cu ft/s (0.465 m^{3}/s)

Basin features
- Progression: Oil Creek → Allegheny River → Ohio River → Mississippi River → Gulf of Mexico
- River system: Allegheny River (Oil Creek)
- Tributaries
  - right: DeWolfe Run
- Bridges: Armstrong Road; Old Grade Road; Tryonville Road

Marsh Run is a 4.0-mile (6.4 km) long tributary to Oil Creek in Crawford County, Pennsylvania.

== Additional Maps ==
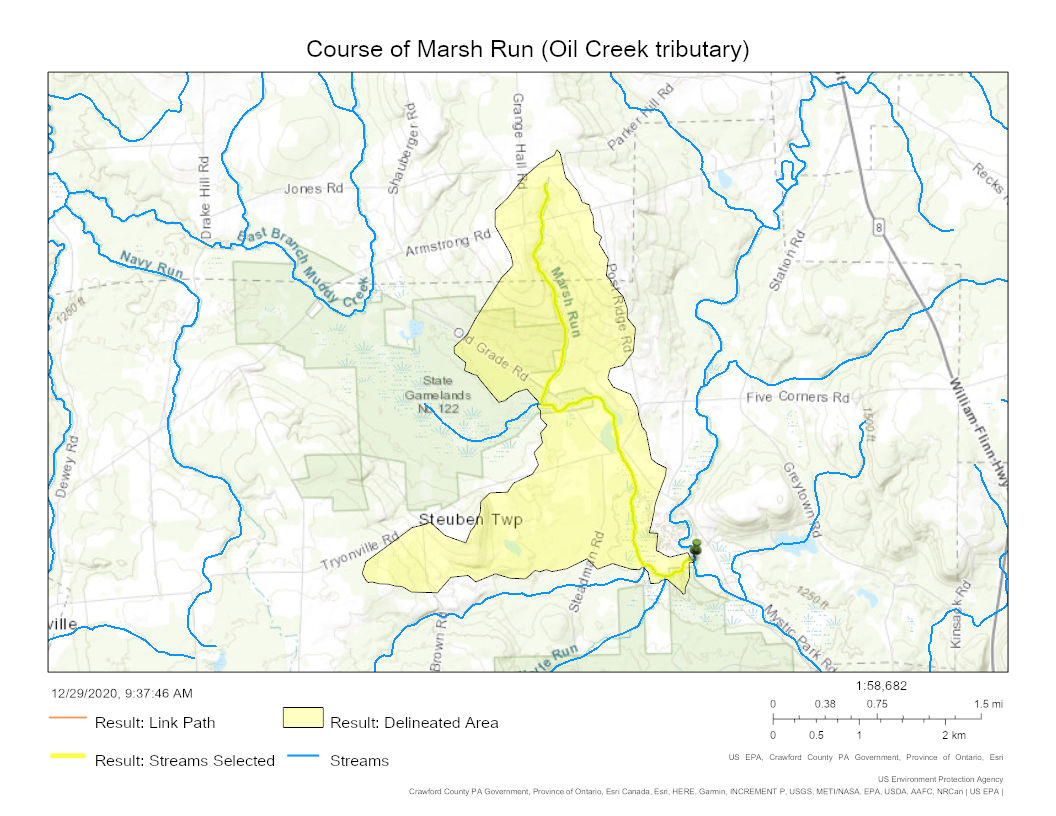
Course of Marsh Run (Oil Creek tributary) in Crawford County, Pennsylvania

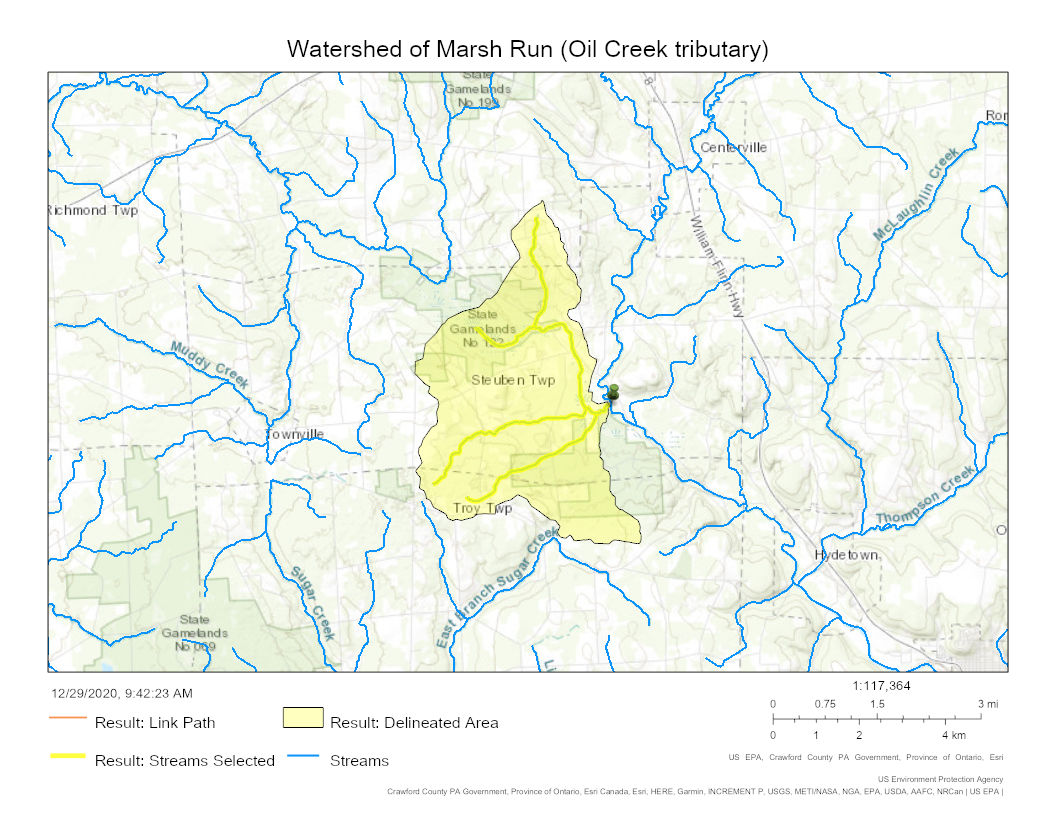
Watershed of Marsh Run (Oil Creek tributary) in Crawford County, Pennsylvania
