= Cherry Run (Oil Creek tributary) =

Stream in Pennsylvania, US

Cherry Run Tributary to Oil Creek
- Location of Cherry Run mouth Cherry Run (Oil Creek tributary) (the United States)

Location
- Country: United States
- State: Pennsylvania
- County: Venango
- City: Rouseville

Physical characteristics
- Source: on divide of Oil Creek and Pithole Creek
  - location: about 0.5 miles southwest of East Shamburg, Pennsylvania
  - coordinates: 41°33′50″N 079°37′56″W
  - elevation: 1,550 ft (470 m)
- Mouth: just west of Rouseville, Pennsylvania
  - location: Rouseville, Pennsylvania
  - coordinates: 41°28′04″N 079°41′34″W
  - elevation: 1,030 ft (310 m)
- Length: 9.9 mi (15.9 km)
- Basin size: 12.8 square miles (33 km^{2})
- Discharge
  - location: Rouseville, Pennsylvania
  - average: 22.94 cu ft/s (0.650 m^{3}/s) at mouth with Oil Creek

Basin features
- Progression: Oil Creek → Allegheny River → Ohio River → Mississippi River → Gulf of Mexico
- River system: Allegheny River
- Tributaries
  - left: numerous unnamed
  - right: numerous unnamed
- Bridges: White City Road, Christie Hill Road (x2), PA 227 (x4), PA 8

Cherry Run is a 4.4 mile (7.1 km) long stream that begins on the divide between Oil Creek and Pithole Creek in Venango County, Pennsylvania.

== Additional Maps ==
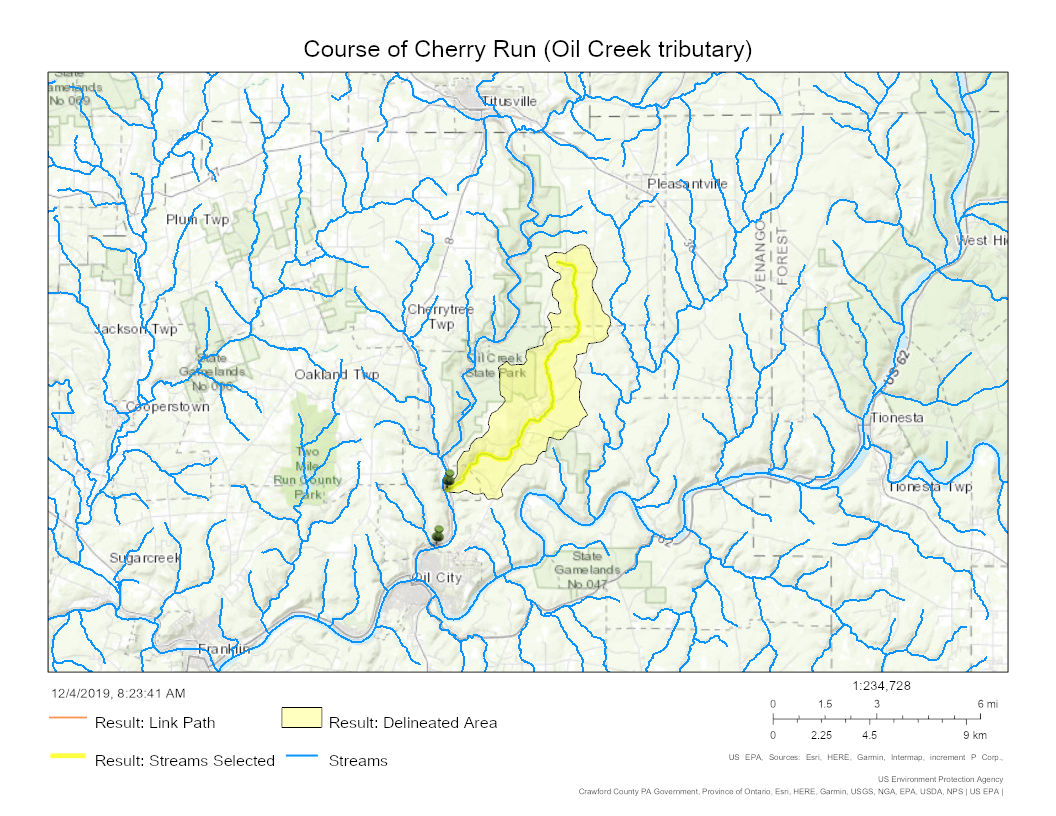
Course of Cherry Run (Oil Creek tributary) in Venango County, Pennsylvania

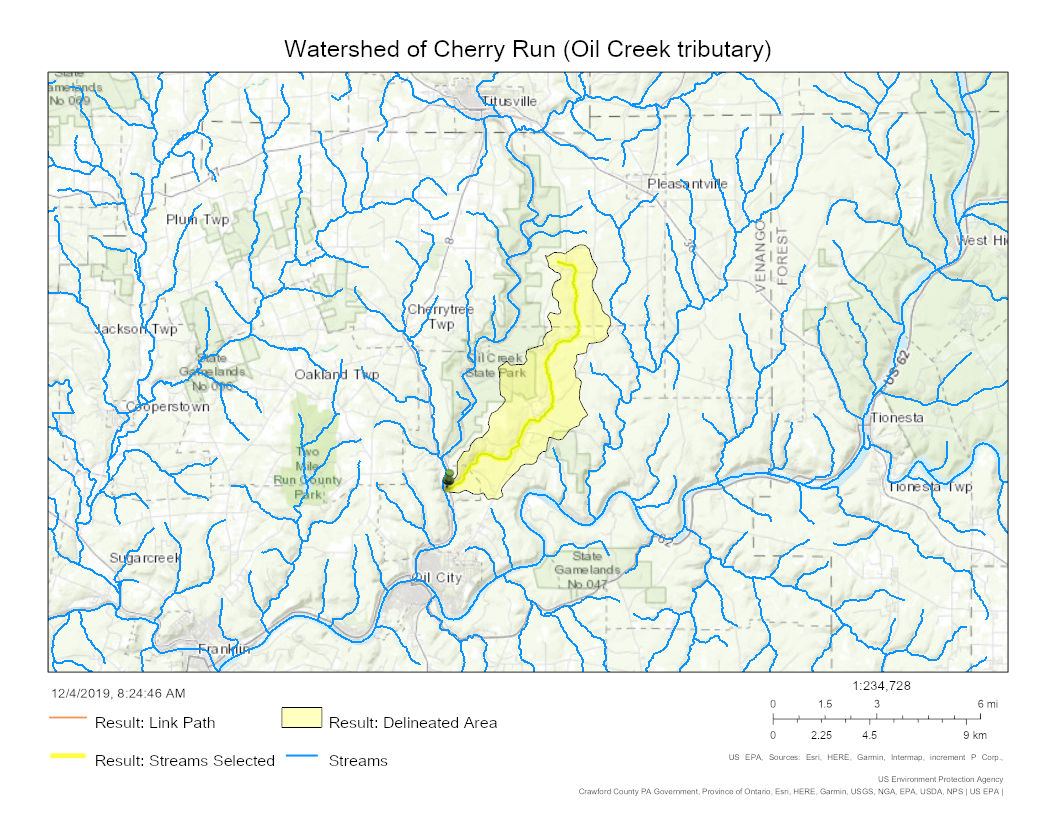
Watershed of Cherry Run (Oil Creek tributary) in Venango County, Pennsylvania
