= Lincolnville, Pennsylvania =

Unincorporated community in Pennsylvania, US

- Census-designated place
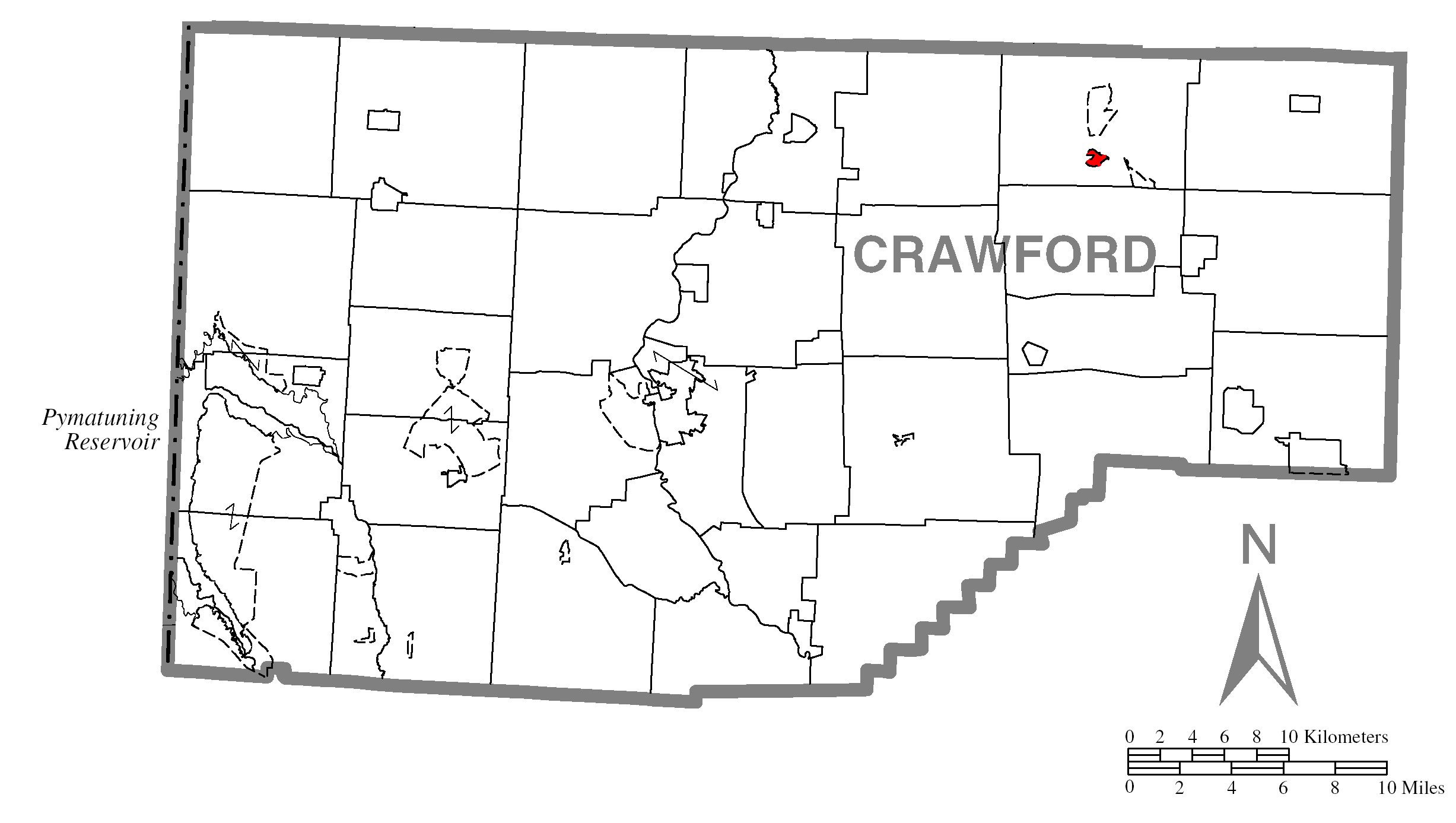
- Location of Lincolnville in Crawford County

- Location of Crawford County in Pennsylvania
- Coordinates: 41°47′33″N 79°50′17″W
- Country: United States
- State: Pennsylvania
- County: Crawford County
- Township: Bloomfield

Area
  - Total: 0.27 sq mi (0.70 km^{2})
  - Land: 0.27 sq mi (0.70 km^{2})
  - Water: 0 sq mi (0.00 km^{2})
- Elevation: 1,379 ft (420 m)

Population (2020)
  - Total: 86
  - Density: 320.3/sq mi (123.68/km^{2})
- Time zone: UTC-4 (EST)
  - Summer (DST): UTC-5 (EDT)
- Area code: 814
- FIPS code: 42-43552

Lincolnville is a census-designated place in Crawford County, Pennsylvania, United States. The population was 96, as per the 2010 census.

== Geography ==
Lincolnville is located in northeastern Crawford County at 41°47′33″N 79°50′17″W (41.792597, -79.838101), in south-central Bloomfield Township. It is on the south side of Oil Creek, 1 mile (1.6 km) south of the source of the creek at the outlet of Canadohta Lake.

According to the United States Census Bureau, the Lincolnville CDP has a total area of 0.3 square miles (0.7 km^{2}), all land.

== Demographics ==
Historical population
Census	Pop.	Note	%±
2020	86		—
U.S. Decennial Census

As of the census of 2000, there were 112 people, 38 households, and 31 families residing in the CDP. The population density was 381.4 inhabitants per square mile (147.3/km^{2}). There were 40 housing units at an average density of 136.2 per square mile (52.6/km^{2}). The racial makeup of the CDP was 100.00% White.

There were 38 households, out of which 36.8% had children under the age of 18 living with them, 68.4% were married couples living together, 10.5% had a female householder with no husband present, and 15.8% were non-families. 10.5% of all households were made up of individuals, and 7.9% had someone living alone who was 65 years of age or older. The average household size was 2.95 and the average family size was 3.13.

In the CDP, the population was spread out, with 26.8% under the age of 18, 10.7% from 18 to 24, 27.7% from 25 to 44, 20.5% from 45 to 64, and 14.3% who were 65 years of age or older. The median age was 34 years. For every 100 females, there were 115.4 males. For every 100 females age 18 and over, there were 82.2 males.

The median income for a household in the CDP was $30,714, and the median income for a family was $27,292. Males had a median income of $30,833 versus $21,250 for females. The per capita income for the CDP was $10,659. There were 22.9% of families and 36.5% of the population living below the poverty line, including 51.7% of under eighteens and none of those over 64.
