= Cornplanter Run (Oil Creek tributary) =

Stream in Pennsylvania, US

Cornplanter Run Tributary to Oil Creek
- Cornplanter Run mouth location Cornplanter Run (Oil Creek tributary) (the United States)

Location
- Country: United States
- State: Pennsylvania
- County: Venango
- City: Oil City

Physical characteristics
- Source: about 1.5 miles north of Oil City, Pennsylvania
  - location: Oil City, Pennsylvania
  - coordinates: 41°28′24″N 079°44′03″W
  - elevation: 1,480 ft (450 m)
- Mouth: Just outside of north city limits of Oil City, Pennsylvania
  - location: Oil City, Pennsylvania
  - coordinates: 41°26′39″N 079°41′59″W
  - elevation: 1,005 ft (306 m)
- Length: 2.75 mi (4.43 km)
- Basin size: 3.3 square miles (8.5 km^{2})
- Discharge
  - location: Cornplanter Township, Pennsylvania
  - average: 5.99 cu ft/s (0.170 m^{3}/s) at mouth with Oil Creek

Basin features
- Progression: Oil Creek → Allegheny River → Ohio River → Mississippi River → Gulf of Mexico
- River system: Allegheny River
- Tributaries
  - left: Calaboose Run
  - right: unnamed tributaries
- Bridges: N Seneca Street

Cornplanter Run is a 2.76-mile-long (4.44 km) tributary to Oil Creek in northwestern Pennsylvania in the United States.

== Course ==
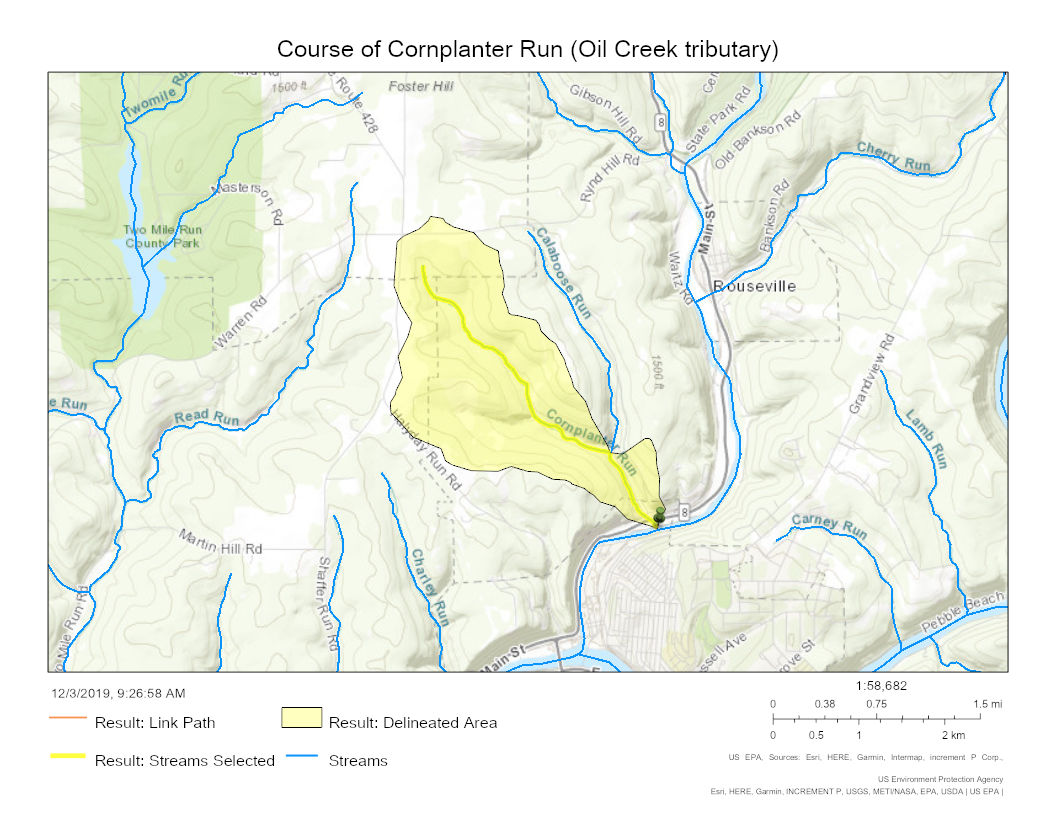
Course of Cornplanter Run (Oil Creek tributary)

Cornplanter Run rises just south of Fosters Corner and flows south to join Oil Creek just north of the city limits of Oil City, Pennsylvania.

Calaboose Run joins this creek about half-way through its course on the left.

Cornplanter Run is a second order stream at its mouth with Oil Creek.

== Watershed ==
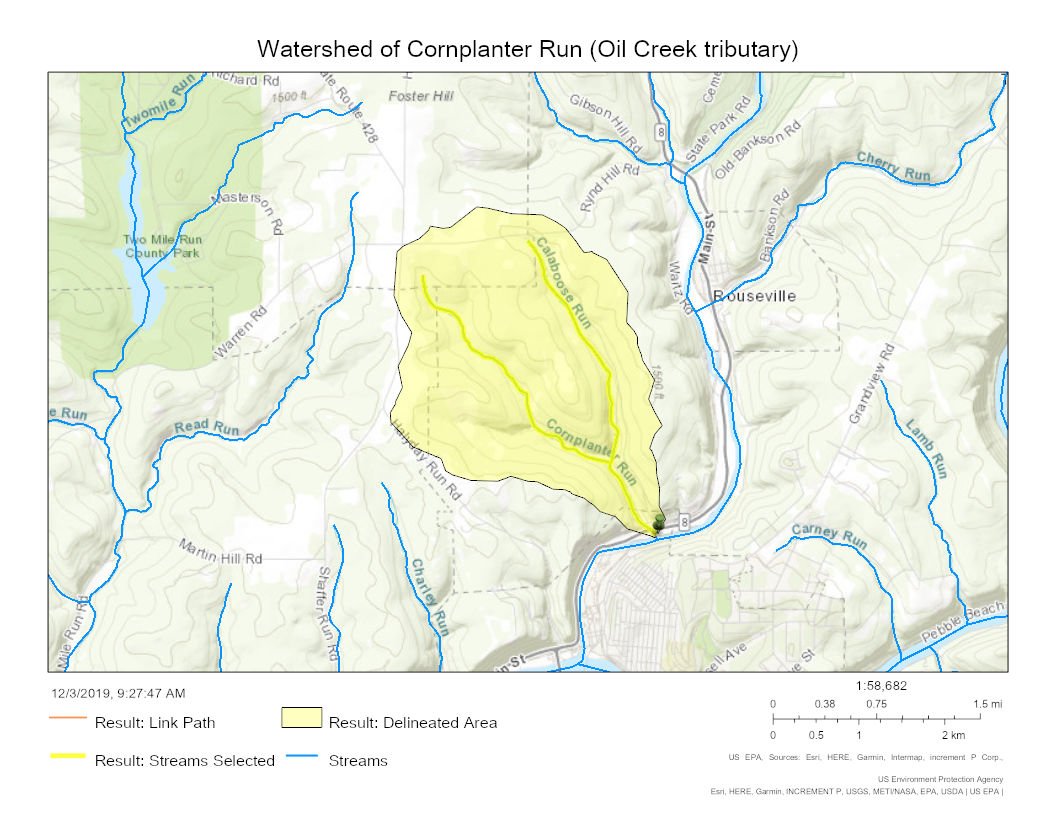
Watershed of Cornplanter Run (Oil Creek tributary)

Cornplanter Run drains 3.3 square miles (8.45 square km) and has an average annual flow of 5.99 cfs (cubic feet/second).

Rainfall averages 44.53 inches (1,130.99 mm) per year. About 83% of the watershed is forested.

== See also ==
- List of rivers of Pennsylvania
