= Canadohta Lake, Pennsylvania =

Unincorporated community in Pennsylvania, US

- Census-designated place
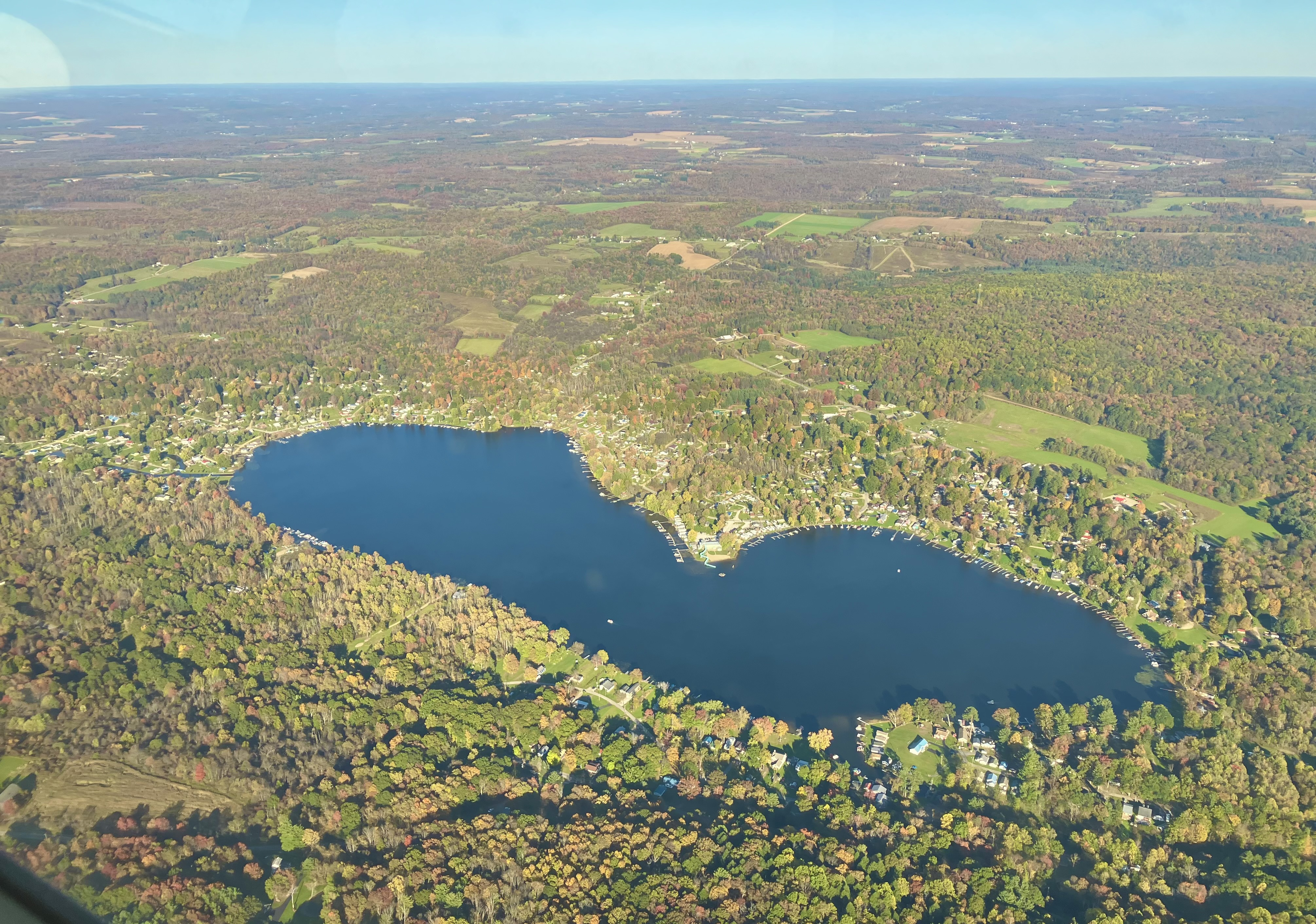
- Canadohta Lake from the air

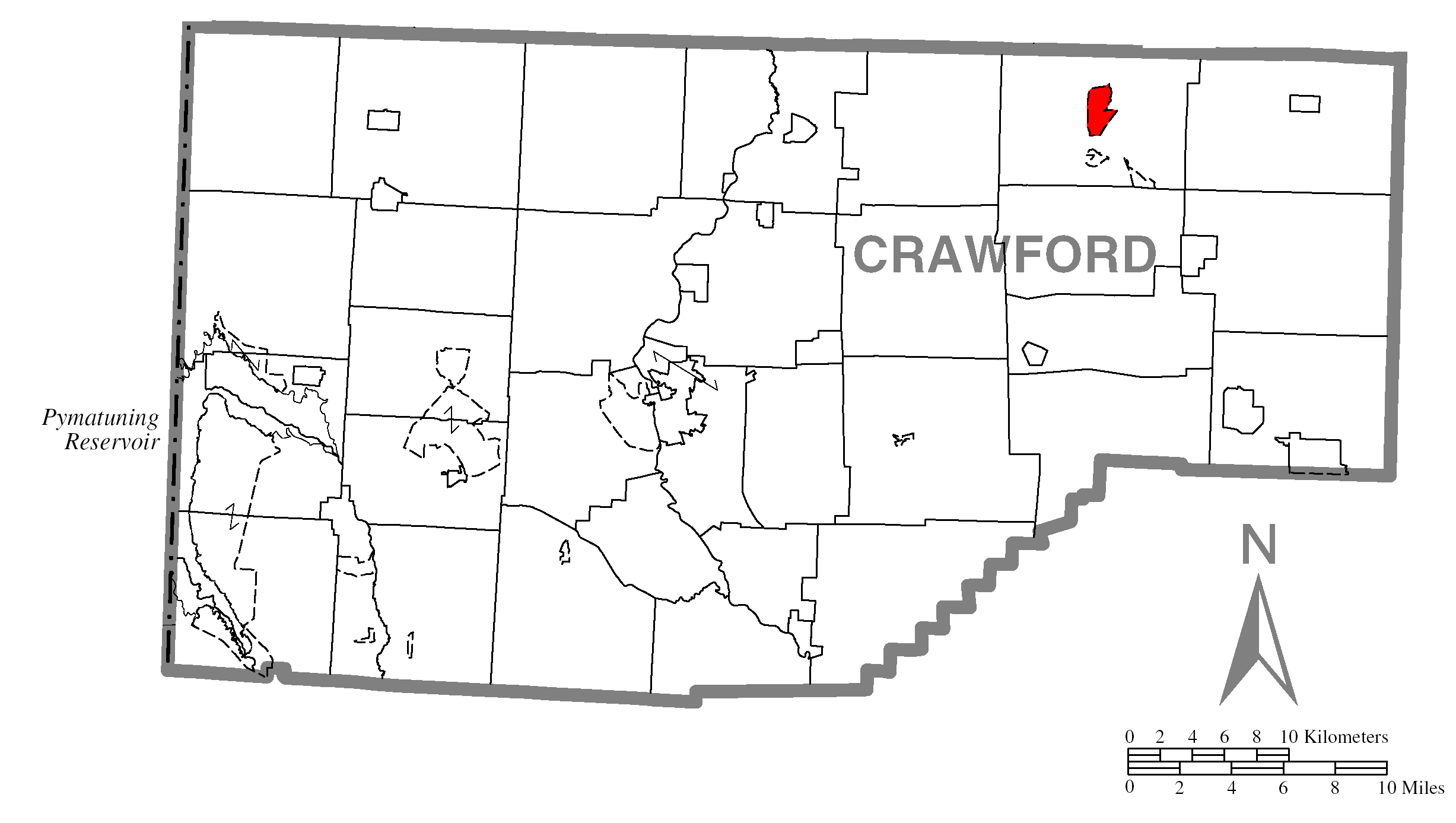
- Location of Canadohta Lake in Crawford County

- Location of Crawford County in Pennsylvania
- Coordinates: 41°48′52″N 79°50′2″W
- Country: United States
- State: Pennsylvania
- County: Crawford County
- Township: Bloomfield

Area
  - Total: 1.46 sq mi (3.78 km^{2})
  - Land: 1.20 sq mi (3.10 km^{2})
  - Water: 0.27 sq mi (0.69 km^{2})
- Elevation: 1,395 ft (425 m)

Population (2020)
  - Total: 503
  - Density: 420.8/sq mi (162.49/km^{2})
- Time zone: UTC-5 (EST)
  - Summer (DST): UTC-4 (EDT)
- ZIP code: 16438
- Area code: 814
- FIPS code: 42-11072

Canadohta Lake is a census-designated place (CDP) in Crawford County, Pennsylvania, United States. The population was 503 at the 2020 census.

== Geography ==
Canadohta Lake is located in northeastern Crawford County at 41°48′52″N 79°50′2″W (41.814395, -79.833965), in the center of Bloomfield Township. The community surrounds Lake Canadohta, a natural water body at the head of Oil Creek, a tributary of the Allegheny River.

According to the United States Census Bureau, the CDP (Census Designated Place) has a total area of 1.5 square miles (3.8 km^{2}), of which 1.2 square miles (3.1 km^{2}) is land and 0.3 square miles (0.7 km^{2}), or 18.21%, is water.

== Demographics ==
Historical population
Census	Pop.	Note	%±
2010	516		—
2020	503		−2.5%
U.S. Decennial Census

As of the census of 2000, there were 572 people, 259 households, and 160 families residing in the CDP. The population density was 466.9 inhabitants per square mile (180.3/km^{2}). There were 882 housing units at an average density of 720.0 per square mile (278.0/km^{2}). The racial makeup of the CDP was 98.95% White, 0.17% African American, 0.17% Asian, and 0.70% from two or more races. Hispanic or Latino of any race were 0.52% of the population.

There were 259 households, out of which 21.6% had children under the age of 18 living with them, 49.4% were married couples living together, 6.9% had a female householder with no husband present, and 38.2% were non-families. 32.0% of all households were made up of individuals, and 8.9% had someone living alone who was 65 years of age or older. The average household size was 2.21 and the average family size was 2.72.

In the CDP, the population was spread out, with 20.6% under the age of 18, 5.4% from 18 to 24, 27.8% from 25 to 44, 28.0% from 45 to 64, and 18.2% who were 65 years of age or older. The median age was 41 years. For every 100 females, there were 101.4 males. For every 100 females age 18 and over, there were 104.5 males.

The median income for a household in the CDP was $33,988, and the median income for a family was $43,472. Males had a median income of $30,962 versus $25,536 for females. The per capita income for the CDP was $18,263. About 5.0% of families and 9.9% of the population were below the poverty line, including 6.7% of those under age 18 and 10.6% of those age 65 or over.
