= Thompson Creek (Oil Creek tributary) =

Stream in Pennsylvania, US

Thompson Creek Tributary to Oil Creek
- Location within Pennsylvania Location within the United States
- Nickname: Thompson Run

Location
- Country: United States
- State: Pennsylvania
- County: Crawford
- City: Hydetown

Physical characteristics
- Source: divide between Thompson Creek and Caldwell Creek
  - location: about 0.5 miles east of Shelmadine Springs, Pennsylvania
  - coordinates: 41°40′32″N 079°33′12″W
  - elevation: 1,600 ft (490 m)
- Mouth: about 1/4 miles southwest of Hydetown, Pennsylvania
  - location: Oil Creek
  - coordinates: 41°38′53″N 079°43′54″W
  - elevation: 1,240 ft (380 m)
- Length: 6.82 mi (10.98 km)
- Basin size: 35.9 square miles (93 km^{2})
- Discharge
  - location: Hydetown, Pennsylvania
  - average: 66.43 cu ft/s (1.881 m^{3}/s) at mouth with Oil Creek

Basin features
- Progression: Oil Creek → Allegheny River → Ohio River → Mississippi River → Gulf of Mexico
- River system: Allegheny River (Oil Creek)
- Population: 1,374 (2010)
- Tributaries
  - left: Hummer Creek
  - right: Shirley Run; McLaughlin Creek

Thompson Creek is a 6.8 mile (11.0 km) 3rd order tributary to Oil Creek that rises on the Caldwell Creek divide in Crawford County, Pennsylvania.

== Variant names ==
According to the Geographic Names Information System, it has also been known historically as:

- Thompson's Run
- Thompsons Run

== Course ==
Thompson Run rises on the Caldwell Creek divide about 0.5 miles east of Shelmadine Springs in Crawford County, Pennsylvania. Thompson Creek then flows west to meet Oil Creek in Hydetown.

== Watershed ==
Thompson Creek drains 35.9 square miles (93 km^{2}) of area, receives about 45.4 in/year of precipitation, has a topographic wetness index of 445.85, and has an average water temperature of 7.35 °C (45.2 °F). The watershed is 53% forested.

== Additional maps ==
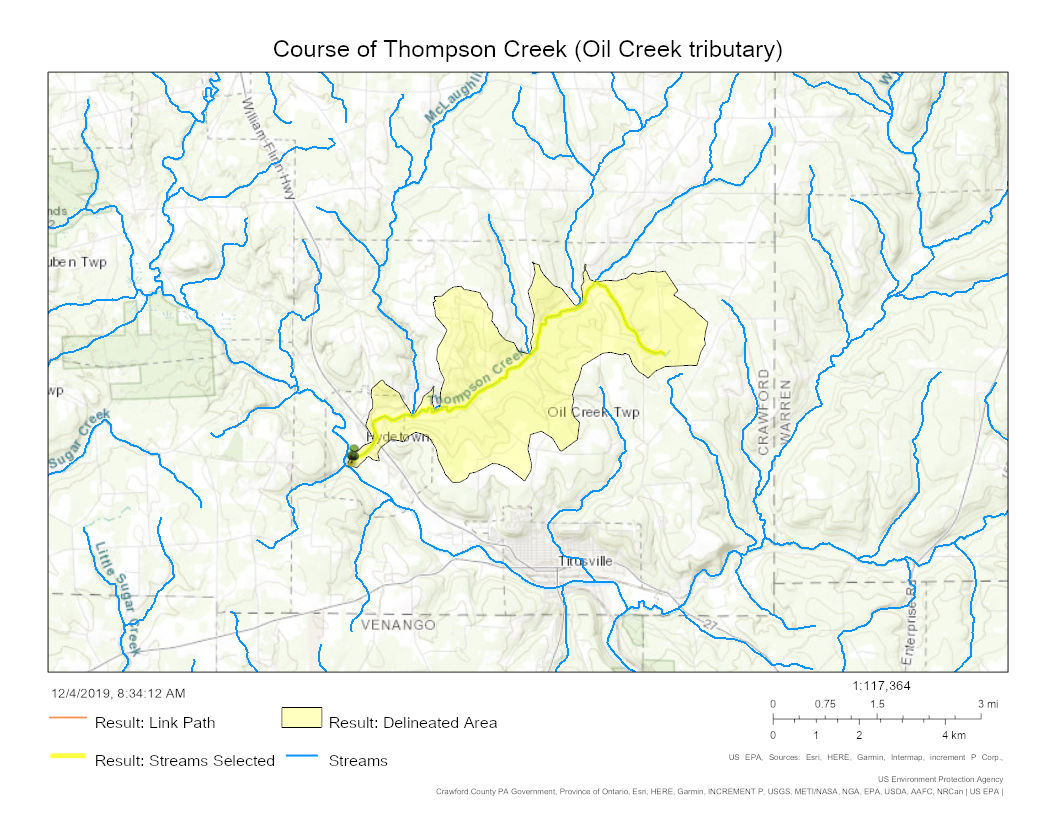
Course of Thompson Creek (Oil Creek tributary)

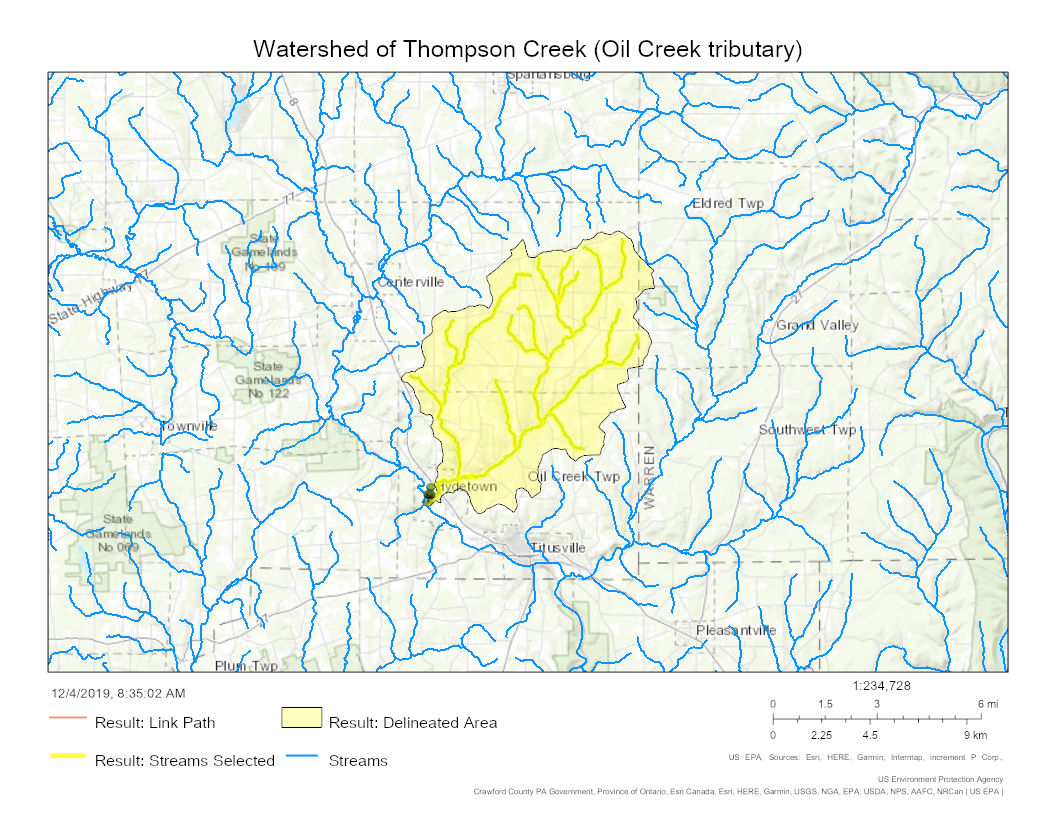
Watershed of Thompson Creek (Oil Creek tributary)
