= Bloomfield Run =

Tributary to Oil Creek in Crawford County, Pennsylvania

Bloomfield Run Tributary to Oil Creek
- Location within Pennsylvania Location within the United States

Location
- Country: United States
- State: Pennsylvania
- County: Crawford

Physical characteristics
- Source: divide between Oil Creek and South Branch French Creek
  - location: Bloomfield Township, Pennsylvania
  - coordinates: 41°49′41″N 079°48′37″W
  - elevation: 1,560 ft (480 m)
- Mouth: Oil Creek at Riceville, Pennsylvania
  - location: Riceville, Pennsylvania
  - coordinates: 41°46′41″N 079°47′35″W
  - elevation: 1,310 ft (400 m)
- Length: 4.0 mi (6.4 km)
- Basin size: 25.85 square miles (67.0 km^{2})
- Discharge
  - average: 180.92 cu ft/s (5.123 m^{3}/s) at mouth with Oil Creek

Basin features
- Progression: Oil Creek → Allegheny River → Ohio River → Mississippi River → Gulf of Mexico
- River system: Allegheny River
- Tributaries
  - left: Pine Hollow Run
  - right: unnamed tributaries
- Bridges: Lake Road, Dutch Hill Road, PA Route 77

Bloomfield Run is a 4.0 mi (6.4 km) long 2nd order tributary to Oil Creek in Crawford County, Pennsylvania.

== Course ==
Bloomfield Run rises on the South Branch French Creek divide in Bloomfield Township, Pennsylvania. Bloomfield Run then flows south-southeast through the Erie Drift Plain to Oil Creek at Riceville, Pennsylvania.

== Watershed ==
Bloomfield Run drains 25.85 square miles (67.0 km^{2}) of area, receives about 46.1 in/year of precipitation, has a topographic wetness index of 470.16 and is about 51% forested.

== Additional images ==
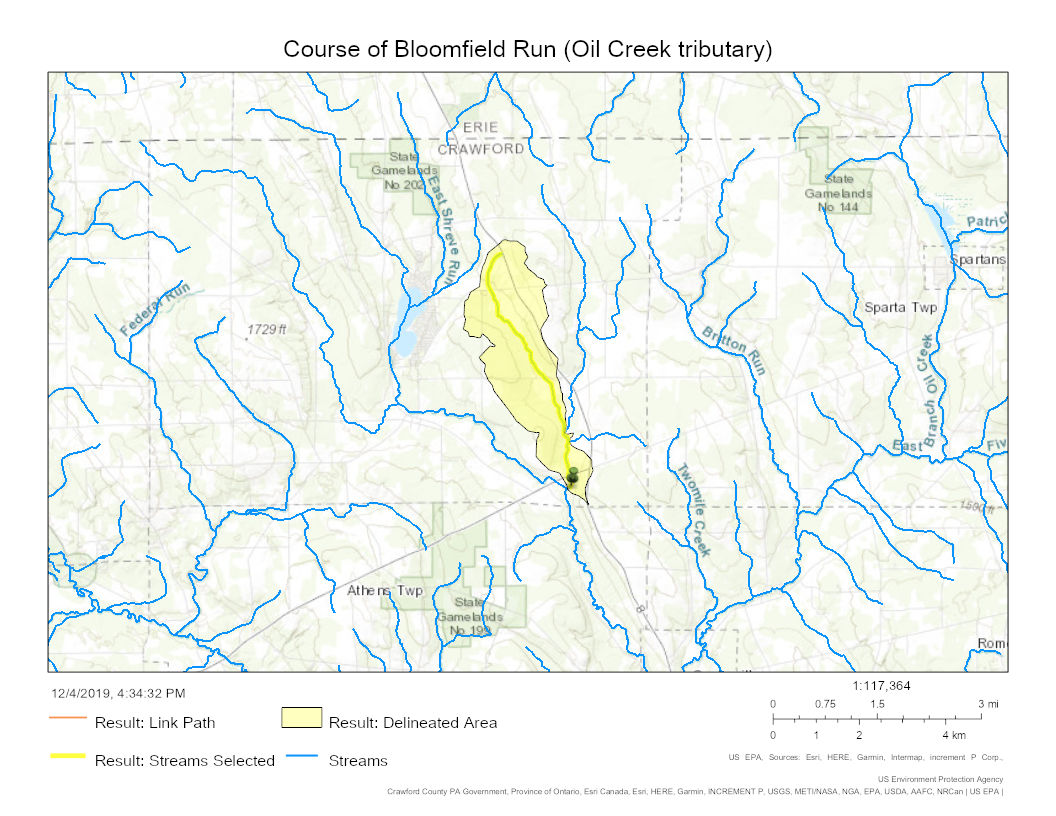
Course of Bloomfield Run (Oil Creek tributary)

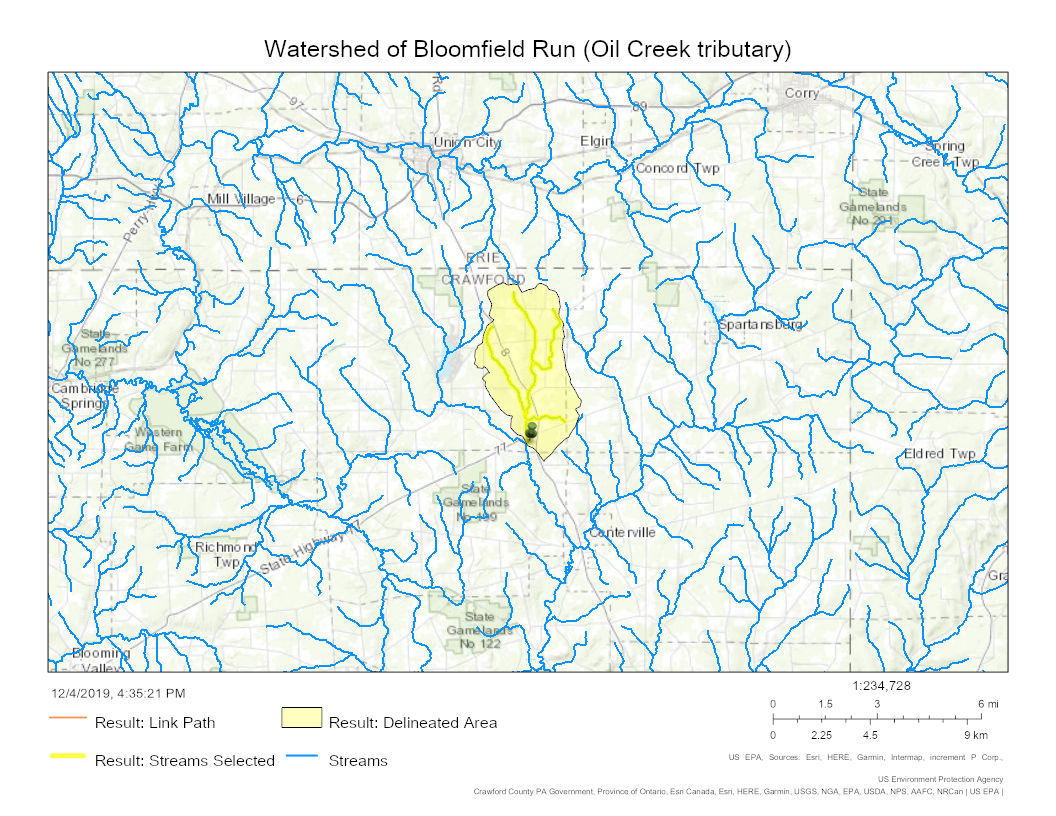
Watershed of Bloomfield Run (Oil Creek tributary)
