= Cherrytree Run (Oil Creek tributary) =

Stream in Pennsylvania, US

Cherrytree Run Tributary to Oil Creek
- Location of the mouth of Cherrytree Run Cherrytree Run (Oil Creek tributary) (the United States)

Location
- Country: United States
- State: Pennsylvania
- Counties: Venango

Physical characteristics
- Source: divide between Cherrytree Run and Prather Creek (French Creek Drainage)
  - location: about 0.5 miles west of Toonerville, Pennsylvania
  - coordinates: 41°34′41″N 079°42′29″W
  - elevation: 1,540 ft (470 m)
- Mouth: Oil Creek
  - location: Rynd Farm, Pennsylvania
  - coordinates: 41°28′52″N 079°41′41″W
  - elevation: 1,048 ft (319 m)
- Length: 8.0 mi (12.9 km)
- Basin size: 16.9 square miles (44 km^{2})
- Discharge
  - location: Rynd Farm, Pennsylvania
  - average: 30.45 cu ft/s (0.862 m^{3}/s) at mouth with Oil Creek

Basin features
- Progression: Oil Creek → Allegheny River → Ohio River → Mississippi River → Gulf of Mexico
- River system: Allegheny River
- Population: 724 (2010)
- Tributaries
  - left: unnamed tributaries
  - right: Kane Run; Wykle Run

Cherrytree Run is a 8.0 mi (12.9 km) long 2nd order tributary to Oil Creek in Venango County, Pennsylvania. This run has the same name as the township, Cherrytree Township, that it drains.

== Variant names ==
According to the Geographic Names Information System, it has also been known historically as:

- Cherry Tree Run

== Course ==
Cherrytree Run rises on the Prather Creek divide about 0.5 miles west of Toonerville, Pennsylvania. Cherrytree Run then flows south to meet Oil Creek at the Rynd Farm.

== Watershed ==
Cherrytree Run drains 16.9 square miles (44 km^{2}) of area, receives about 44.9 in/year of precipitation, has a topographic wetness index of 429.10, and has an average water temperature of 7.79 °C. The watershed is 75% forested.

== Additional Maps ==
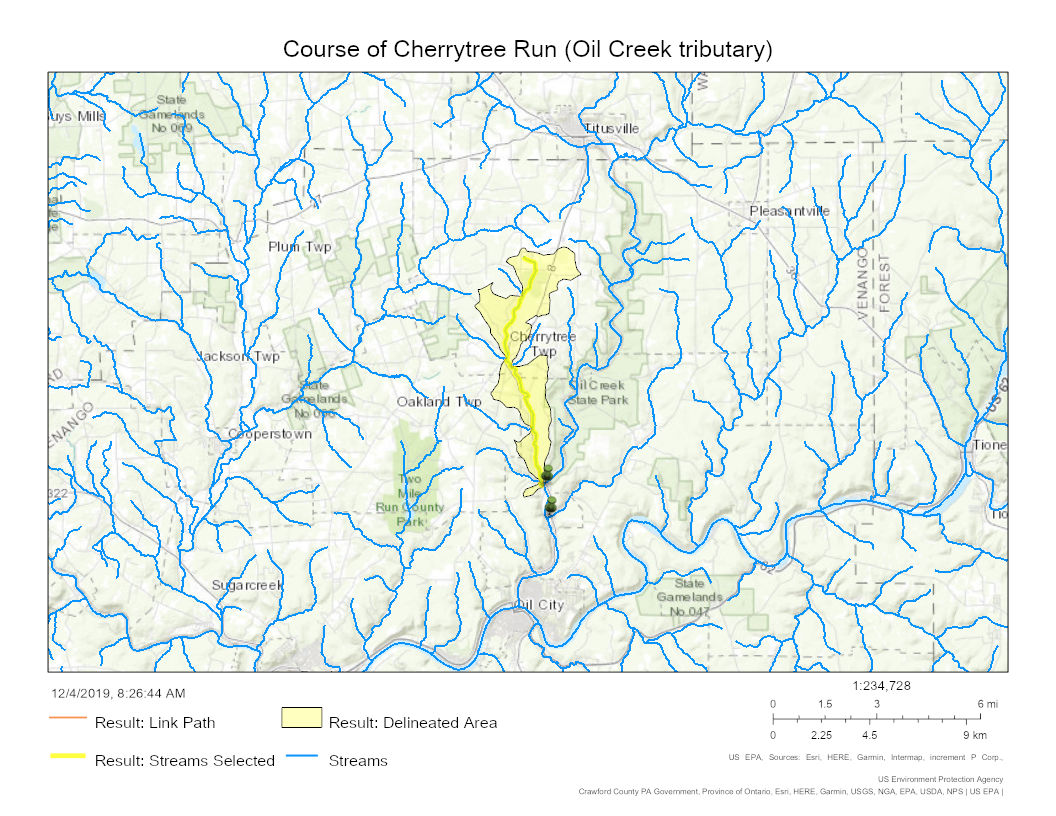
Course of Cherrytree Run (Oil Creek tributary)

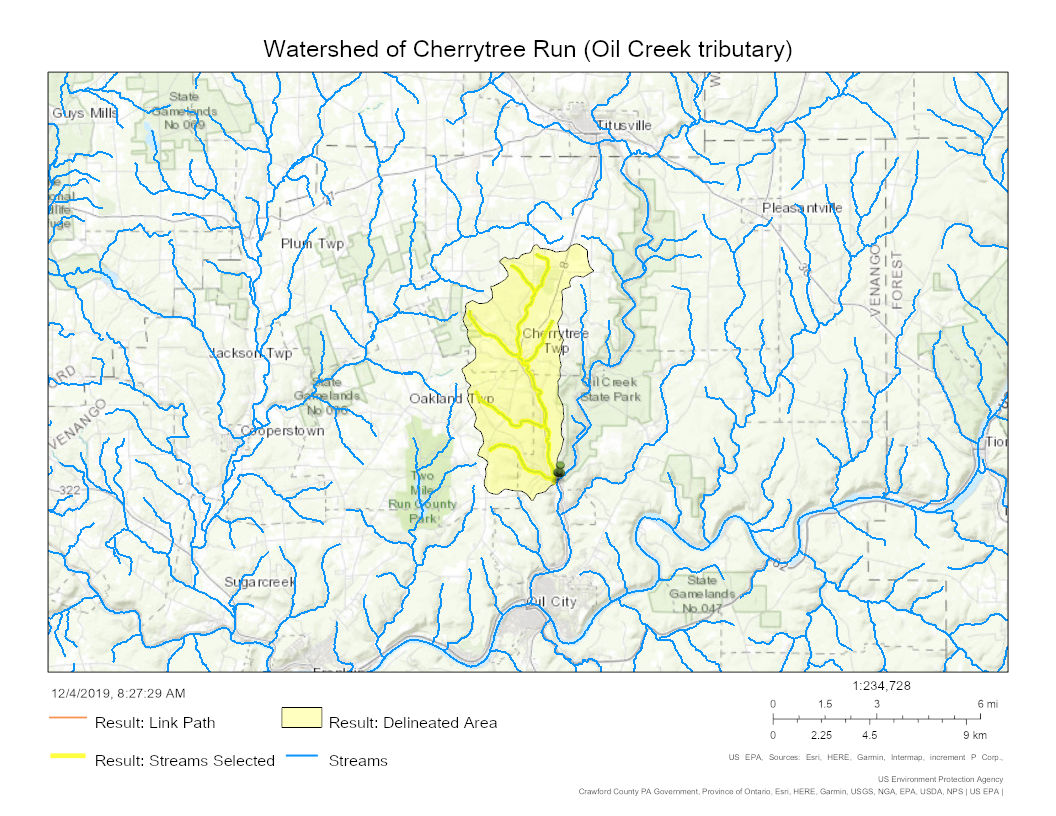
Watershed of Cherrytree Run (Oil Creek tributary)
