= Hydetown, Pennsylvania =

Borough in Pennsylvania, US

- Borough
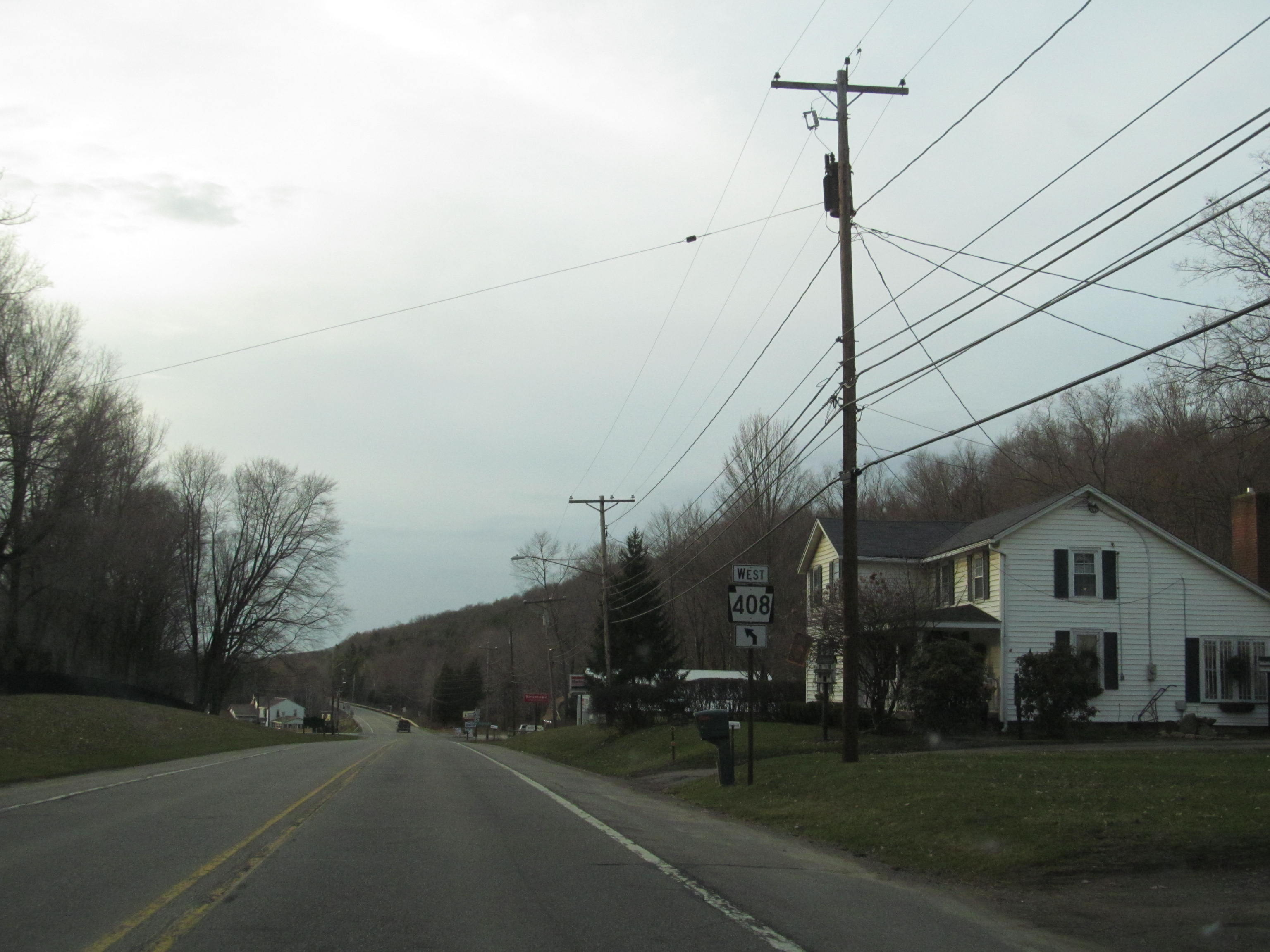
- PA 8 northbound in Hydetown
- Motto: A small town with a big heart.
- Location of Hydetown in Crawford County, Pennsylvania.

- Location of Hydetown in Pennsylvania
- Coordinates: 41°39′8″N 79°43′33″W
- Country: United States
- State: Pennsylvania
- County: Crawford
- Founded: 1862

Government
  - Mayor: Scott Smith (R)

Area
  - Total: 2.24 sq mi (5.81 km^{2})
  - Land: 2.24 sq mi (5.81 km^{2})
  - Water: 0 sq mi (0.00 km^{2})
- Elevation (middle of borough): 1,250 ft (380 m)
- Highest elevation (east side of borough): 1,560 ft (480 m)
- Lowest elevation (Oil Creek): 1,220 ft (370 m)

Population (2020)
  - Total: 526
  - Estimate (2022): 521
  - Density: 235.8/sq mi (91.05/km^{2})
- Time zone: UTC-4 (EST)
  - Summer (DST): UTC-5 (EDT)
- ZIP code: 16328
- Area code: 814
- FIPS code: 42-36616
- Website: hydetownboroughpa.org

Hydetown is a borough in Crawford County, Pennsylvania, United States. The population was 526 at the 2020 census, up from 526 at the 2010 census, down from 605 in 2000. It was established in 1862.

== Geography ==
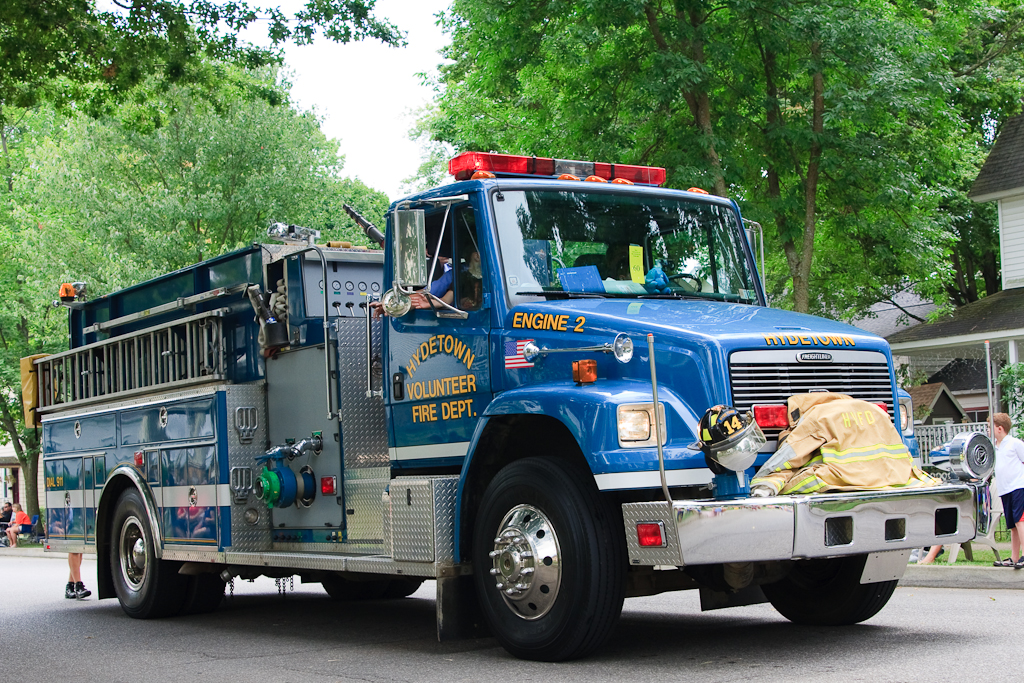
Fire Engine 2, Hydetown Volunteer Fire Department seen at the 2011 Titusville Oil Parade

Hydetown is located in eastern Crawford County at 41°39′8″N 79°43′33″W (41.652312, -79.725872). It is surrounded by Oil Creek Township, a separate municipality. Pennsylvania Route 8 passes through the borough, leading southeast 3 miles (5 km) to Titusville and north 6 miles (10 km) to Centerville. Pennsylvania Route 408 leads west 8 miles (13 km) to Townville.

According to the United States Census Bureau, the borough has a total area of 2.2 square miles (5.8 km^{2}), all land.

=== Natural features ===
Hydetown Borough is located just south of the southern terminal moraine for glaciation in northwestern Pennsylvania. The borough is drained by Oil Creek, a southward-flowing tributary of the Allegheny River, which runs through the northwestern and southwestern sides of the borough and Thompson Creek, which enters from the northeast and joins the main creek southwest of the borough center. The lowest elevation in Hydetown is 1,220 ft (370 m) where Oil Creek flows south out of the borough. The highest elevation is 1,560 ft (480 m) at the eastern borough boundary.

== Demographics ==
Historical population
Census	Pop.	Note	%±
1870	428		—
1880	405		−5.4%
1890	247		−39.0%
1900	337		36.4%
1910	413		22.6%
1920	336		−18.6%
1930	420		25.0%
1940	446		6.2%
1950	530		18.8%
1960	679		28.1%
1970	725		6.8%
1980	760		4.8%
1990	681		−10.4%
2000	605		−11.2%
2010	526		−13.1%
2020	529		0.6%
2022 (est.)	521	▼	−1.5%

As of the census of 2000, there were 605 people, 251 households, and 157 families residing in the borough. The population density was 279.0 inhabitants per square mile (107.7/km^{2}). There were 264 housing units at an average density of 121.7 per square mile (47.0/km^{2}). The racial makeup of the borough was 99.17% White and 0.83% Asian. Hispanic or Latino of any race were 0.66% of the population.

There were 251 households, out of which 24.7% had children under the age of 18 living with them, 53.8% were married couples living together, 4.4% had a female householder with no husband present, and 37.1% were non-families. 30.3% of all households were made up of individuals, and 14.7% had someone living alone who was 65 years of age or older. The average household size was 2.41 and the average family size was 3.04.

In the borough the population was spread out, with 23.1% under the age of 18, 8.4% from 18 to 24, 23.6% from 25 to 44, 26.4% from 45 to 64, and 18.3% who were 65 years of age or older. The median age was 42 years. For every 100 females there were 106.5 males. For every 100 females age 18 and over, there were 100.4 males.

The median income for a household in the borough was $34,563, and the median income for a family was $42,188. Males had a median income of $26,389 versus $17,417 for females. The per capita income for the borough was $14,891. About 5.0% of families and 12.8% of the population were below the poverty line, including 19.1% of those under age 18 and 15.1% of those age 65 or over.

== Education ==
Hydetown is part of the Titusville Area School District.
