= Toonerville, Pennsylvania =

Unincorporated community in Pennsylvania, US

Coordinates: 41°34′11″N 79°41′27″W

Toonerville is an unincorporated community in Venango County, in the U.S. state of Pennsylvania.

The community was named after Toonerville Folks, a comic strip.
