= Rouseville, Pennsylvania =

Borough in Pennsylvania, US

- Borough
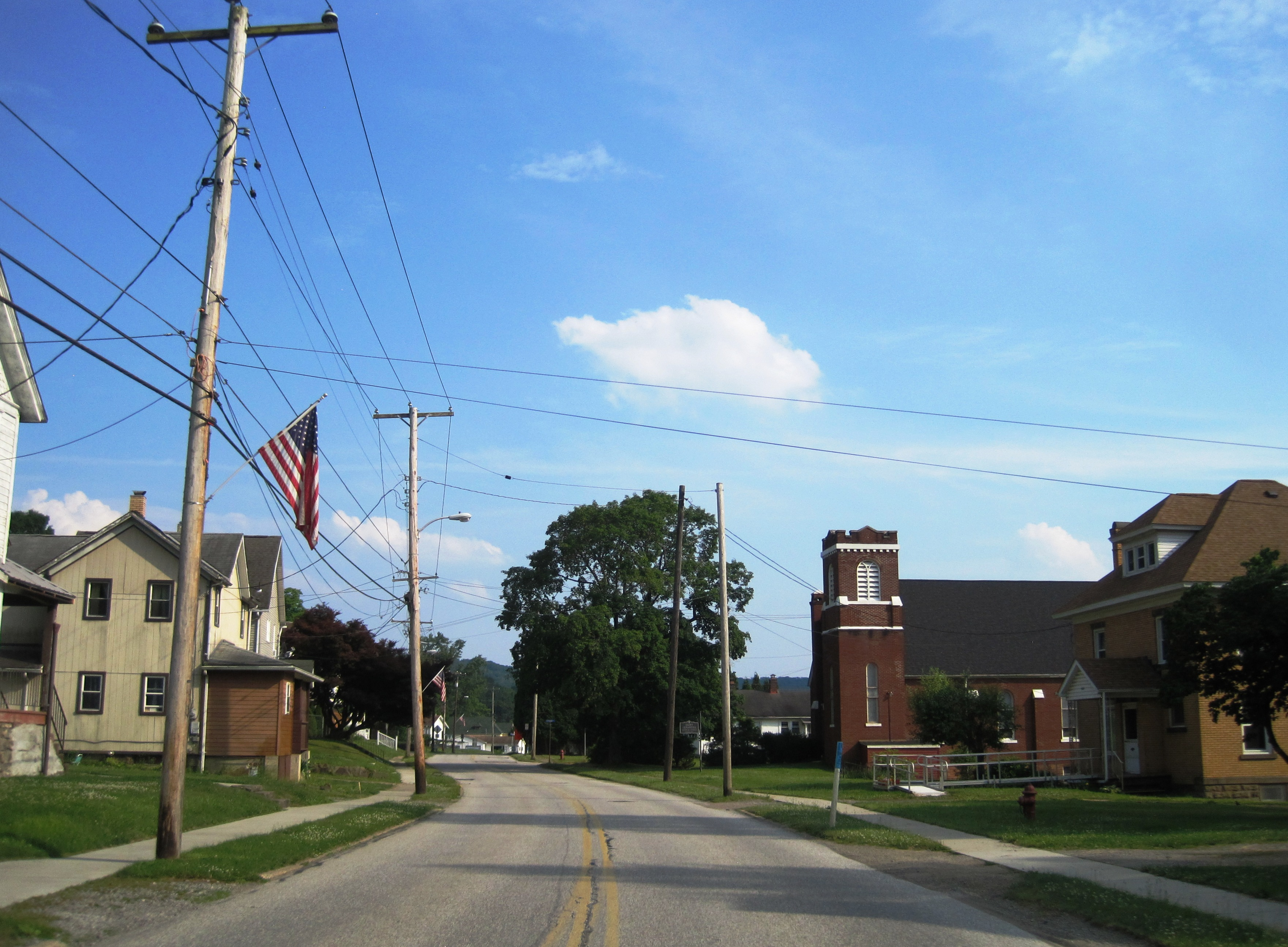
- Southbound PA 8 (Main Street)

- Location of Rouseville in Venango County, Pennsylvania.

- Location within Pennsylvania
- Coordinates: 41°28′17″N 79°41′22″W
- Country: United States
- State: Pennsylvania
- County: Venango
- Incorporated: 1900

Government
  - Type: Borough Council

Area
  - Total: 0.91 sq mi (2.35 km^{2})
  - Land: 0.89 sq mi (2.31 km^{2})
  - Water: 0.012 sq mi (0.03 km^{2})

Population (2020)
  - Total: 456 ▼
  - Estimate (2021): 451
  - Density: 529.5/sq mi (204.43/km^{2})
- Time zone: UTC-5 (Eastern (EST))
  - Summer (DST): UTC-4 (EDT)
- Zip code: 16344
- Area code: 814
- FIPS code: 42-66440

Rouseville is a borough in Venango County, Pennsylvania, United States. The population was 456 at the 2020 census.

== Geography ==
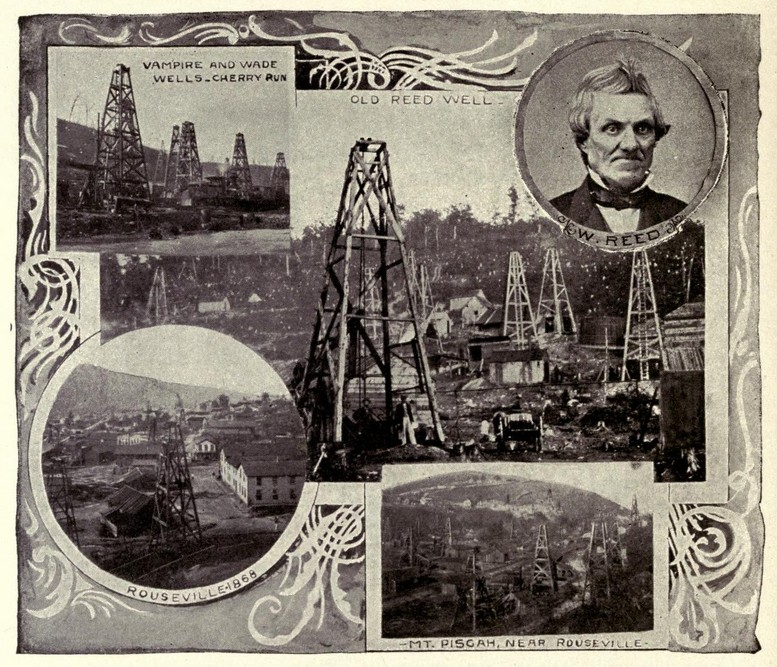
Rouseville during the oil boom, c. 1868

Rouseville is located at 41°28′17″N 79°41′22″W (41.471398, -79.689469).

According to the United States Census Bureau, the borough has a total area of 0.9 square miles (2.4 km^{2}), of which 0.9 square mile (2.4 km^{2}) is land and 0.04 square mile (0.1 km^{2}) (2.15%) is water.

== Demographics ==
Historical population
Census	Pop.	Note	%±
1880	688		—
1900	516		—
1910	648		25.6%
1920	818		26.2%
1930	1,059		29.5%
1940	998		−5.8%
1950	1,009		1.1%
1960	923		−8.5%
1970	877		−5.0%
1980	734		−16.3%
1990	583		−20.6%
2000	472		−19.0%
2010	523		10.8%
2020	457		−12.6%
2021 (est.)	451	▼	−1.3%

As of the census of 2000, there were 472 people, 204 households, and 137 families residing in the borough. The population density was 520.4 inhabitants per square mile (200.9/km^{2}). There were 240 housing units at an average density of 264.6 per square mile (102.2/km^{2}). The racial makeup of the borough was 98.73% White, 0.42% African American and 0.85% Native American. Hispanic or Latino of any race were 0.64% of the population.

There were 204 households, out of which 22.1% had children under the age of 18 living with them, 48.5% were married couples living together, 13.2% had a female householder with no husband present, and 32.4% were non-families. 29.9% of all households were made up of individuals, and 18.1% had someone living alone who was 65 years of age or older. The average household size was 2.29 and the average family size was 2.76.

In the borough the population was spread out, with 20.8% under the age of 18, 5.9% from 18 to 24, 24.8% from 25 to 44, 23.1% from 45 to 64, and 25.4% who were 65 years of age or older. The median age was 44 years. For every 100 females there were 95.0 males. For every 100 females age 18 and over, there were 86.1 males.

The median income for a household in the borough was $22,917, and the median income for a family was $30,341. Males had a median income of $29,250 versus $18,125 for females. The per capita income for the borough was $13,286. About 16.3% of families and 25.2% of the population were below the poverty line, including 38.2% of those under age 18 and 20.1% of those age 65 or over.
