= Pennsylvania Route 428 =

State highway in Pennsylvania, US

Pennsylvania Route 428

Route information
- Maintained by PennDOT
- Length: 19.383 mi (31.194 km)

Major junctions
- South end: US 62 / PA 8 in Oil City
- PA 417 in Oakland Township; PA 27 in Plum Township
- North end: PA 408 in Troy Township

Location
- Country: United States
- State: Pennsylvania
- Counties: Venango, Crawford

Highway system
- Pennsylvania State Route System; Interstate; US; State; Scenic; Legislative
← PA 427	→ PA 430

Pennsylvania Route 428 (PA 428) is a 19-mile-long (31 km) state highway located in Venango and Crawford counties in Pennsylvania. The southern terminus is at U.S. Route 62 (US 62) and PA 8 in Oil City. The northern terminus is at PA 408 in Troy Township.

== Route description ==
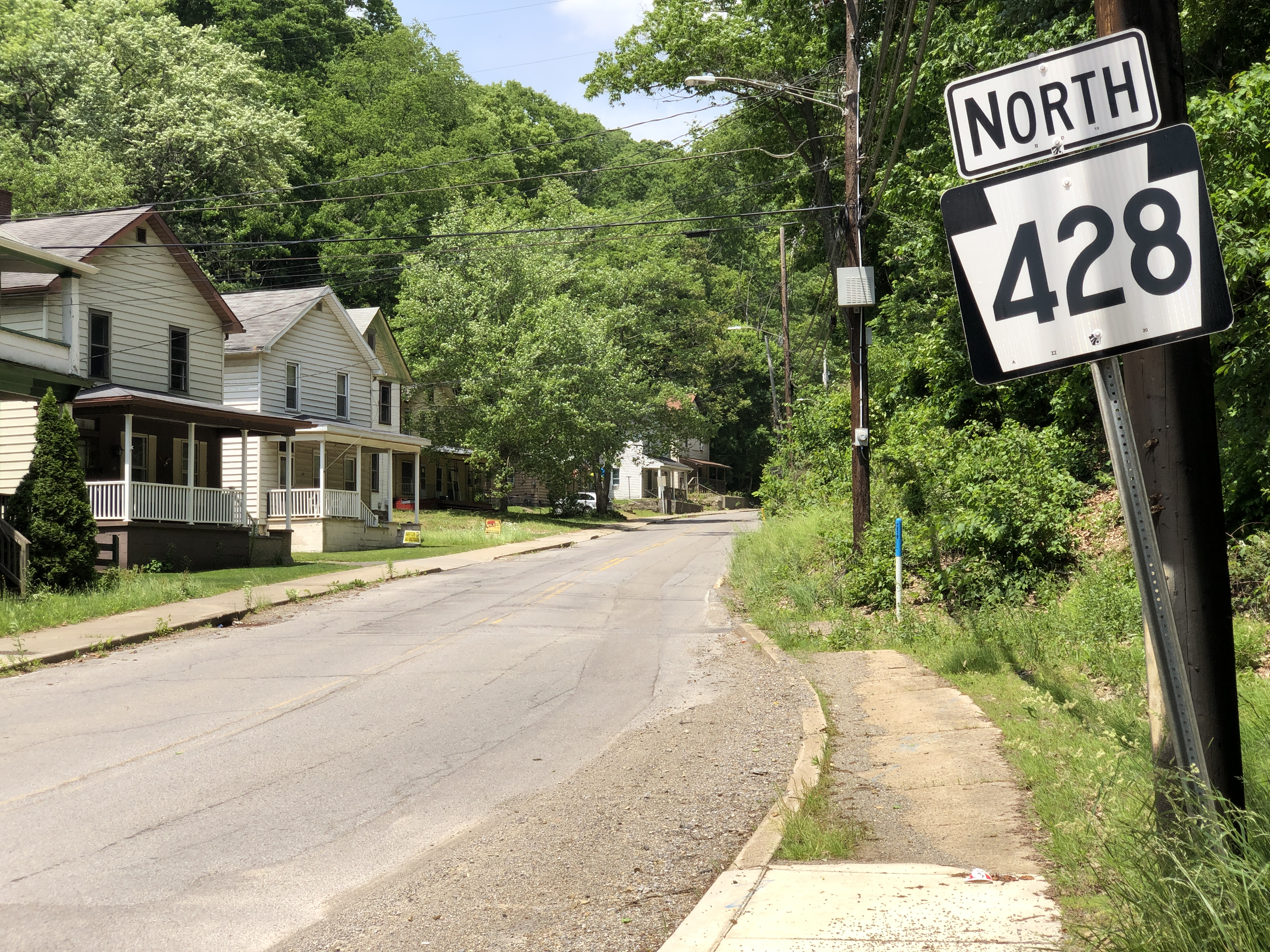
PA 428 northbound past US 62/PA 8 in Oil City

PA 428 begins at an intersection with US 62/PA 8 in the city of Oil City in Venango County, heading north on two-lane undivided Halyday Street. The road heads through wooded areas with occasional homes, crossing into Cornplanter Township and becoming Halyday Run Road. The route curves to the northwest and heads through more woodland with some fields and residences as it continues into the borough of Sugarcreek and turns north. PA 428 enters Oakland Township and becomes an unnamed road, passing through Fosters Corners and running through more farmland and woodland with some homes, curving northwest. The road continues northwest through more rural areas, coming to an intersection with PA 417. At this point, PA 428 turns northeast to form a concurrency with PA 417 for a short distance before heading north onto Wallaceville Road. The route heads through more agricultural and wooded areas with a few residences, turning northwest and crossing into Plum Township. The road heads north again and passes through Wallaceville, running north-northwest through wooded areas. PA 428 turns northeast to remain on Wallaceville Road, continuing through more woodland with occasional fields. The route curves north at Propers Corners before a turn to the east and another curve back to the north. The road runs through areas of farms and woods with some homes as it reaches the PA 27 intersection. Here, PA 428 turns southwest to follow PA 27 briefly on Meadville Road before splitting at Diamond and heading northwest on Troy Center Road. The route heads through more farmland and woodland with occasional residences, heading north.

PA 428 enters Troy Township in Crawford County and continues north through more rural areas on Troy Center Road. The road makes a curve to the northwest and runs through more farms and woods with some homes, reaching the community of Troy Center. At this point, the route turns north to remain on Troy Center Road and runs through more rural areas, ending at an intersection with PA 408.

== Major intersections ==
County	Location	mi	km	Destinations	Notes
Venango	Oil City	0.000	0.000	US 62 / PA 8 (Petroleum Street / Main Street) – Franklin	Southern terminus
Venango	Oakland Township	7.329	11.795	PA 417 south – Franklin	South end of PA 417 overlap
Venango	Oakland Township	7.498	12.067	PA 417 north – Titusville	North end of PA 417 overlap
Venango	Plum Township	14.818	23.847	PA 27 east (Meadville Road) – Titusville	South end of PA 27 overlap
Venango	Plum Township	14.920	24.011	PA 27 west (Meadville Road) – Meadville	North end of PA 27 overlap
Crawford	Troy Township	19.383	31.194	PA 408 – Townville	Northern terminus
1.000 mi = 1.609 km; 1.000 km = 0.621 mi: Concurrency terminus
