= Pennsylvania Route 427 =

State highway in Pennsylvania, US

Pennsylvania Route 427

Route information
- Maintained by PennDOT
- Length: 10.653 mi (17.144 km)
- Existed: 1928–present

Major junctions
- South end: US 322 in Sugarcreek
- North end: PA 27 near Bradleytown

Location
- Country: United States
- State: Pennsylvania
- Counties: Venango, Crawford

Highway system
- Pennsylvania State Route System; Interstate; US; State; Scenic; Legislative
← PA 426	→ PA 428

Pennsylvania Route 427 (PA 427) is a 10.7-mile-long (17.2 km) state highway located in Venango and Crawford counties in Pennsylvania. The southern terminus is at U.S. Route 322 (US 322) in Sugarcreek. The northern terminus is at PA 27 near Bradleytown.

== Route description ==
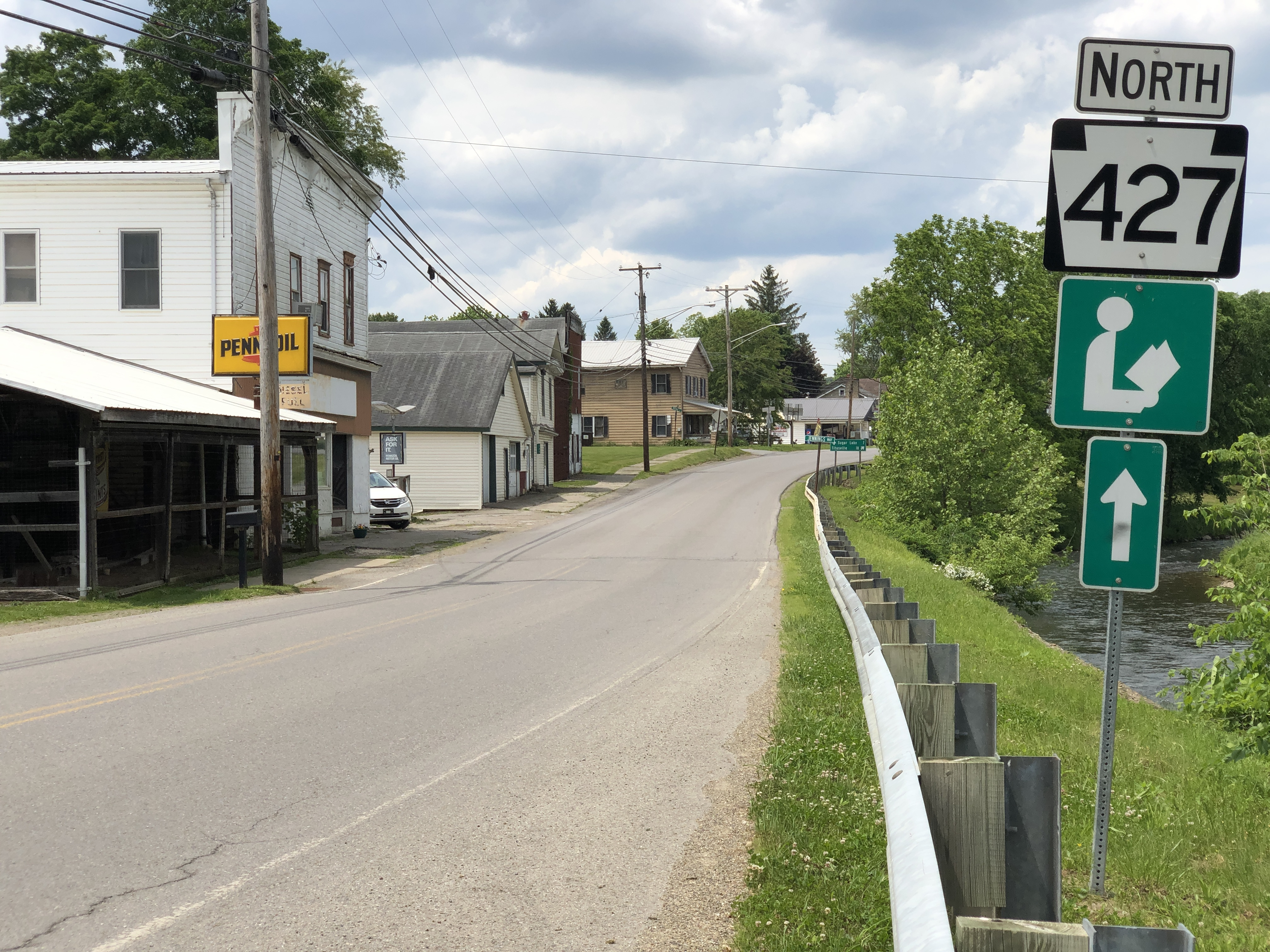
PA 427 northbound in Cooperstown

PA 427 begins at an intersection with US 322 in the borough of Sugarcreek in Venango County, heading northwest on a two-lane undivided road. The route parallels US 322 before turning north past a few rural homes. The road heads northeast into farmland, turning east before curving north into wooded areas, running to the east of Sugar Creek. PA 427 turns west to cross the creek, curving north into agricultural areas with some woods and residences. The route continues into Jackson Township and turns northeast to cross Sugar Creek again before making another curve to the north. The road heads into the borough of Cooperstown and becomes South Main Street, heading into residential areas and turning northeast to run along the east bank of Sugar Creek. PA 427 turns west onto Factory Street and crosses the creek prior to heading northwest onto North Main Street and passing a few businesses. The route turns north onto Academy Street and runs between homes the west and the Sugar Creek to the east, curving to the northeast. The road becomes Bradleytown Road as it heads back into Jackson Township and runs north through open farmland with occasional residences. PA 427 continues through areas of farms and woods as it passes through Plum Corners. The road heads into more wooded areas with some farm fields as it crosses into Plum Township and turns to the northeast. The route crosses Sugar Creek again and comes to Bradleytown, where it turns north to remain along Bradleytown Road. PA 427 heads through more agricultural areas with some woods and homes, crossing the creek. The route enters Troy Township in Crawford County and immediately ends at PA 27.

== Major intersections ==
County	Location	mi	km	Destinations	Notes
Venango	Sugarcreek	0.000	0.000	US 322 (Twenty-Eighth Division Highway) – Franklin, Meadville	Southern terminus
Crawford	Troy Township	10.653	17.144	PA 27 (Guys Mill Road) – Meadville, Titusville	Northern terminus
1.000 mi = 1.609 km; 1.000 km = 0.621 mi
