= Pennsylvania Route 86 =

State highway in Crawford County, Pennsylvania, US

Pennsylvania Route 86
- SR 886

Route information
- Maintained by PennDOT
- Length: 12.440 mi (20.020 km)

Major junctions
- South end: PA 27 in Meadville
- PA 198 in Woodcock Township
- North end: US 6 / US 19 / PA 408 in Cambridge Springs

Location
- Country: United States
- State: Pennsylvania
- Counties: Crawford

Highway system
- Pennsylvania State Route System; Interstate; US; State; Scenic; Legislative
← I-86	→ PA 87

Pennsylvania Route 86 (abbreviated PA 86, officially SR 886) is a 12.4-mile-long (20.0 km) state highway in Crawford County, Pennsylvania, United States. The northern terminus of the route is at U.S. Route 6, U.S. Route 19, and Pennsylvania Route 408 in Cambridge Springs. The southern terminus is at Pennsylvania Route 27 in Meadville.

Due to the presence of Interstate 86 (State Route 86) in Erie County, PA 86 is officially State Route 886.

Nearby attractions include Allegheny College and Woodcock Lake.

From 1936 to 1983, PA 86 extended from US 19 north of Waterford to PA 27 in Meadville. In 1983, the northern terminus was moved to its present location at US 6 and US 19 in Cambridge Springs.

== Route description ==
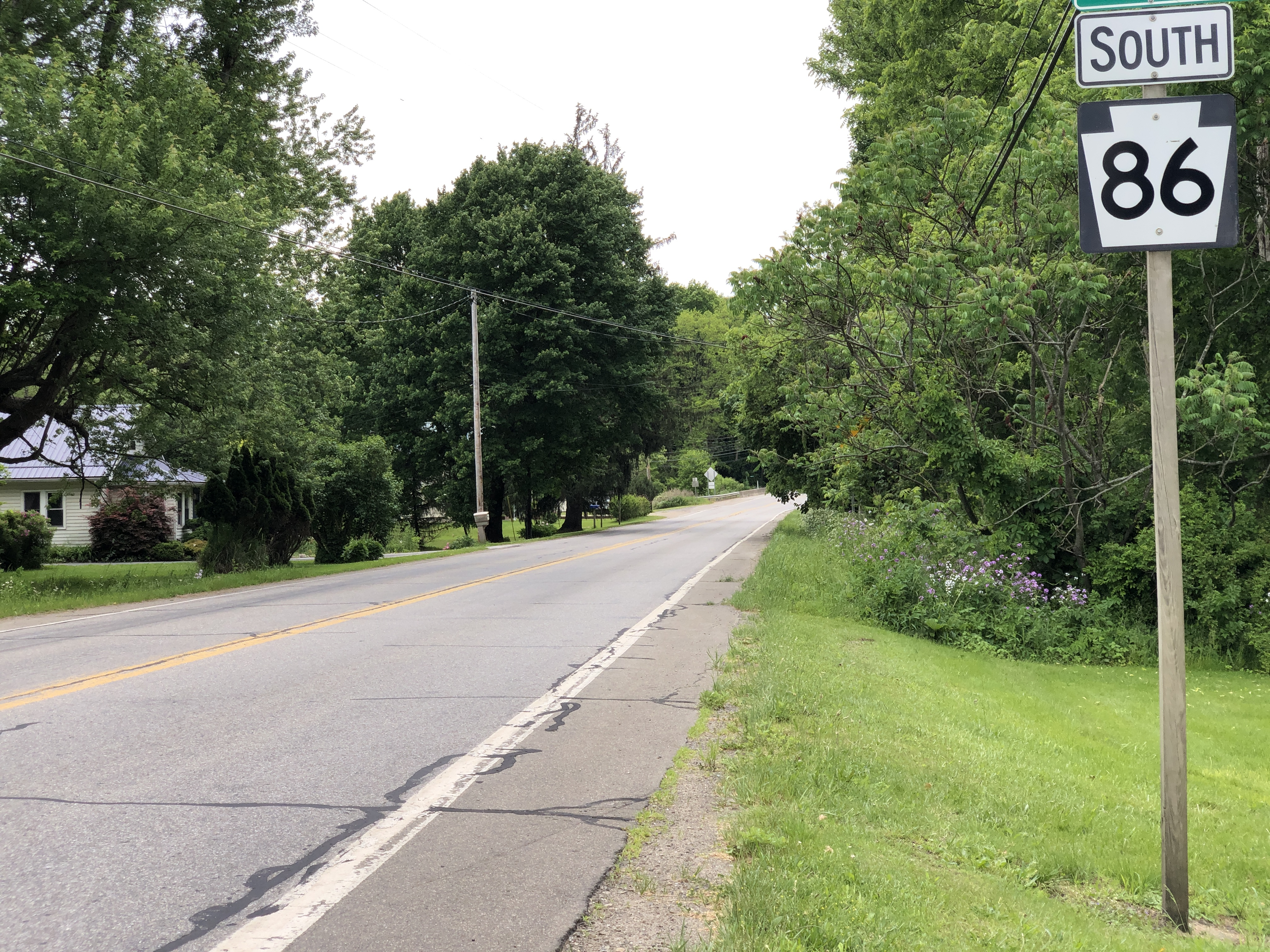
PA 86 southbound past PA 198 in Woodcock Township

PA 86 begins at an intersection with PA 27 in the city of Meadville, heading north on two-lane undivided North Main Street. The road passes a mix of homes and businesses, heading into more residential areas and passing to the east of Allegheny College. The route runs near more homes before briefly heading into West Mead Township, where it is known as North Main Street Extension. PA 86 crosses into Woodcock Township and becomes an unnamed road, passing through a mix of farms and woods with some homes. The route continues northeast and forms a short concurrency with PA 198. The road passes through the residential community of Grange Hall before continuing through more agricultural areas with occasional homes. PA 86 becomes Center Street before entering Woodcock, where the road passes a few residences on Main Street. The route crosses into Cambridge Township and becomes an unnamed road again, continuing through farmland and woodland with some homes. The road curves to the north and enters the borough of Cambridge Springs, where it becomes South Main Street. Here, the route passes homes, turning northeast and heading into the commercial downtown. PA 86 crosses a Western New York and Pennsylvania Railroad line and immediately ends at an intersection with US 6/US 19 and PA 408.

== Major intersections ==
The entire route is in Crawford County.

Location	mi	km	Destinations	Notes
Meadville	0.0	0.0	PA 27 (North Street)	Southern terminus
Woodcock Township	4.5	7.2	PA 198 east	South end of PA 8 concurrency
Woodcock Township	4.6	7.4	PA 198 west (South Street)	North end of PA 198 overlap
Cambridge Springs	12.4	20.0	US 6 / US 19 (North Main Street / Venango Avenue) / PA 408 east (Church Street)	Northern terminus; western terminus of PA 408
1.000 mi = 1.609 km; 1.000 km = 0.621 mi: Concurrency terminus

== PA 86 Alternate Truck ==
PA Route 86 Alternate Truck
- Location: Crawford County, Pennsylvania
- Existed: 2013–2017

Pennsylvania Route 86 Alternate Truck was a truck route around a weight-restricted bridge over the Gravel Run, on which trucks over 32 tons and combination loads over 40 tons were prohibited. The route followed PA 198, PA 77, and PA 408. The route was signed in 2013. The bridge was completely reconstructed in 2017, and all signage was removed, effectively deleting the route.

== See also ==
- List of state highways in Pennsylvania
- List of highways numbered 86
