= Pennsylvania Route 408 =

State highway in Crawford County, Pennsylvania, US

Pennsylvania Route 408

Route information
- Maintained by PennDOT
- Length: 24.2 mi (38.9 km)

Major junctions
- West end: US 6 / US 19 / PA 86 in Cambridge Springs
- PA 77 in Richmond Township; PA 428 in Troy Township
- East end: PA 8 in Hydetown

Location
- Country: United States
- State: Pennsylvania
- Counties: Crawford

Highway system
- Pennsylvania State Route System; Interstate; US; State; Scenic; Legislative
← PA 407	→ PA 409

Pennsylvania Route 408 (PA 408) is a 24.2-mile-long (38.9 km) state highway located in Crawford County, Pennsylvania. The western terminus is at US 6/US 19/PA 86 in Cambridge Springs. The eastern terminus is at PA 8 in Hydetown.

== Route description ==
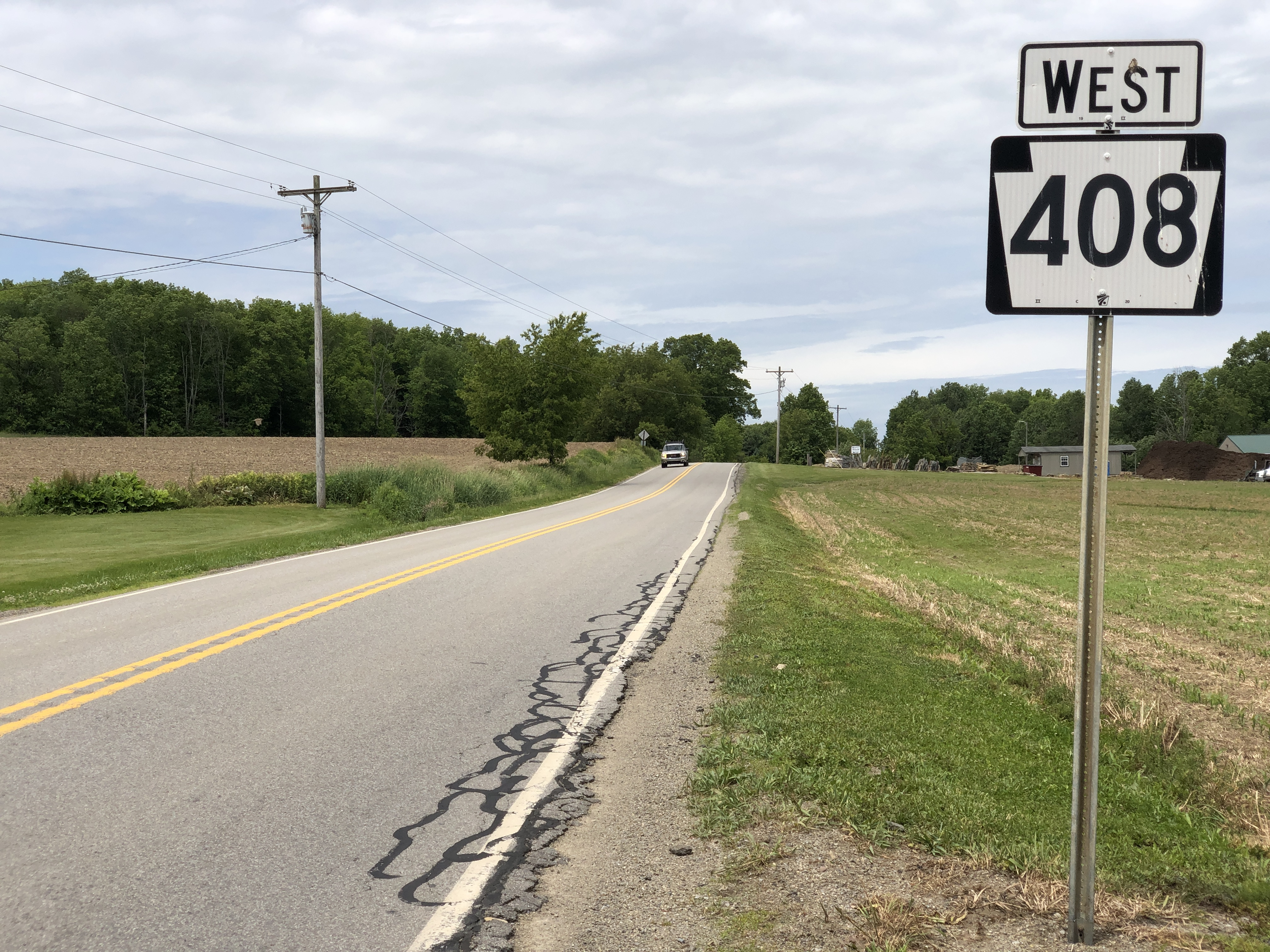
PA 408 westbound in Richmond Township

PA 408 begins at an intersection with US 6/US 19 and PA 86 in the borough of Cambridge Springs, heading east-southeast on two-lane undivided Church Street and immediately crossing a Western New York and Pennsylvania Railroad line. The road passes businesses before entering residential areas. The route continues into Cambridge Township and becomes an unnamed road as it heads into agricultural areas with some homes. Upon heading into Rockdale Township, PA 408 makes a turn to the south prior to curving southeast again through more farmland with some woods and residences. The road enters Richmond Township, where it curves to the south and heads through more forested areas with some farm fields and homes. PA 408 turns west to form a short concurrency with PA 77 before heading south again. Farther south, the route makes a turn to the east and passes more farms, woods, and residences. The road continues into Steuben Township prior to coming into the borough of Townville, where it turns to the southeast. In this borough, the route runs past several homes and a few businesses. PA 408 crosses back into Steuben Township and heads back into rural areas of farmland and woodland, soon coming into Troy Township. In this area, the road intersects PA 428 and passes through more rural areas, turning more to the east. The route enters Oil Creek Township and heads into forests, soon coming into the borough of Hydetown. PA 408 curves northeast and crosses the Oil Creek, passing farm fields before entering residential areas and turning southeast onto Main Street. The route comes to its eastern terminus at an intersection with PA 8.

== Major intersections ==
The entire route is in Crawford County.

Location	mi	km	Destinations	Notes
Cambridge Springs	0.0	0.0	US 6 / US 19 (North Main Street / Venango Avenue) / PA 86 south (South Main Street)	Western terminus; northern terminus of PA 86
Richmond Township	9.0	14.5	PA 77 east – Spartansburg	West end of PA 77 overlap
Richmond Township	9.1	14.6	PA 77 west – Meadville	East end of PA 77 overlap
Troy Township	17.7	28.5	PA 428 south (Troy Center Road) – Oil City	Northern terminus of PA 428
Hydetown	24.2	38.9	PA 8 (Hydetown Road) – Union City, Titusville	Eastern terminus
1.000 mi = 1.609 km; 1.000 km = 0.621 mi

== PA 408 Alternate Truck ==
PA Route 408 Alternate Truck
- Location: Crawford County, Pennsylvania
- Existed: 2013–present

Pennsylvania Route 408 Alternate Truck is a truck route around a weight-restricted bridge over the Thompson Creek on which trucks over 33 tons and combination loads over 40 tons were prohibited. The route followed PA 77, PA 89, and PA 8. It was signed in 2013. The bridge was reconstructed in 2016, but as of July 2024, the route is still signed.
