= Pennsylvania Route 8 =

State highway in Pennsylvania, US

Pennsylvania Route 8
- William Flinn Highway
- Route of PA 8 highlighted in red, and business and truck routes in blue

Route information
- Maintained by PennDOT
- Length: 148.6 mi (239.1 km)

Major junctions
- South end: I-376 / US 22 / US 30 in Wilkinsburg
- PA 28 in Pittsburgh; I-76 Toll / Penna Turnpike in Hampton Township; US 422 near Butler; I-80 near Barkeyville; US 62 / US 322 in Franklin; US 6 in Union City; I-90 near Erie
- North end: US 20 in Erie

Location
- Country: United States
- State: Pennsylvania
- Counties: Allegheny, Butler, Venango, Crawford, Erie

Highway system
- Pennsylvania State Route System; Interstate; US; State; Scenic; Legislative
← PA 7	→ PA 9

Pennsylvania Route 8 (PA 8) is a major 148.6-mile-long (239.1 km) state route in western Pennsylvania. Officially, PA 8 is named the William Flinn Highway.

Its southern terminus is at Interstate 376 (I-376)/U.S. Route 22 (US 22)/US 30 in Pittsburgh. Its northern terminus is US 20 in Erie.

== Route description ==
=== Pittsburgh to Interstate 80 ===
The southern terminus of PA 8 is at an interchange with I-376/US 22/US 30 east of downtown Pittsburgh. The route, running along Ardmore Boulevard, Penn Avenue and Washington Boulevard, heads west from I-376 and runs through the eastern districts of the city. PA 8 has intersections with Pennsylvania Route 380 and Pennsylvania Route 130 prior to crossing the Allegheny River and exiting Pittsburgh.

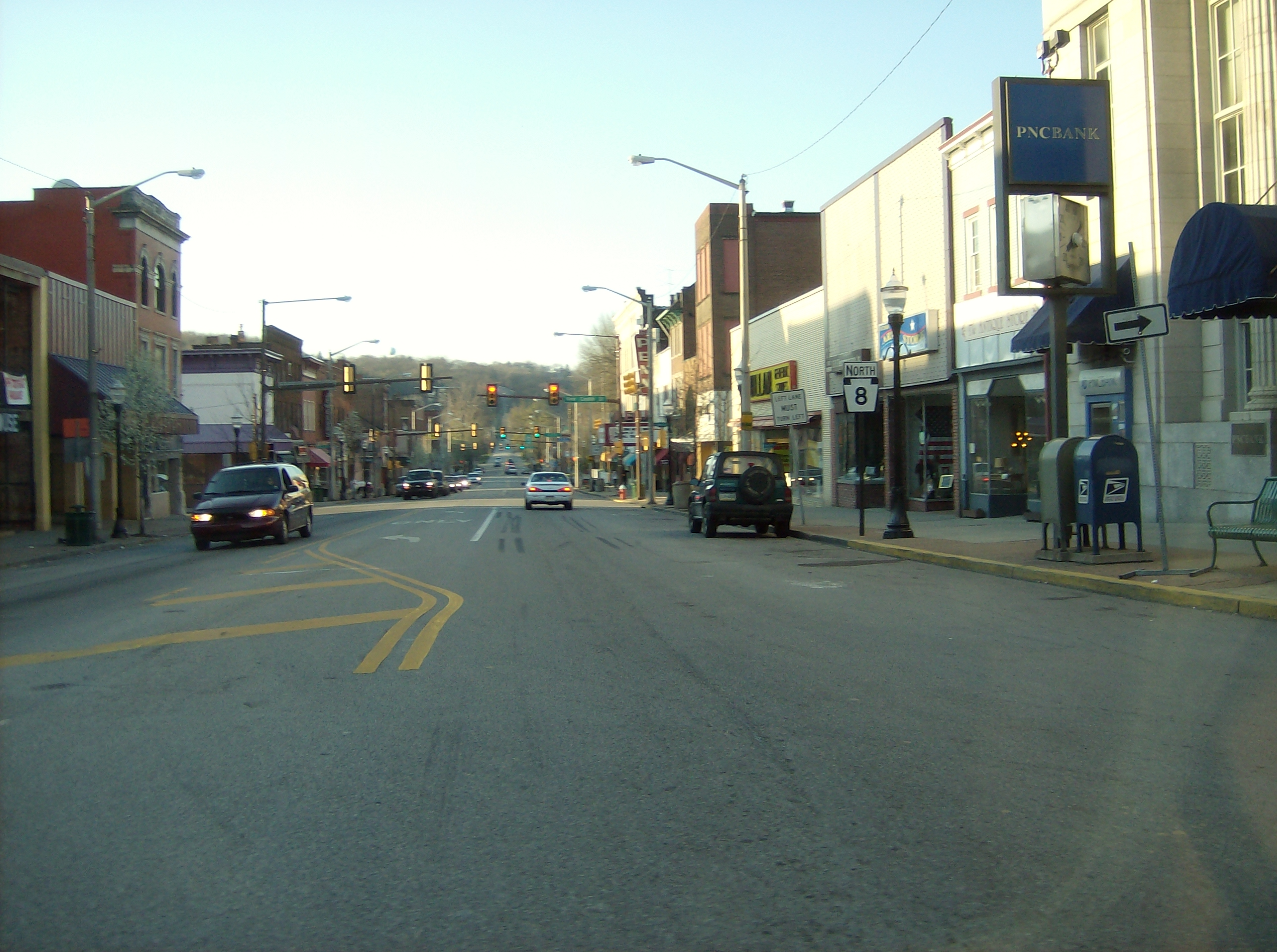
PA 8 is a major street in downtown Butler.

North of the bridge that crosses the Allegheny River, PA 8 meets Pennsylvania Route 28 at an interchange. 8 miles (13 km) north of Pittsburgh, PA 8 intersects Interstate 76 and the Pennsylvania Turnpike at exit 39. In Middlesex Township, PA 8 runs concurrent with Pennsylvania Route 228 for 2 miles (3 km). In Butler, PA 8 crosses Connoquenessing Creek on the General Richard Butler Bridge then runs with Pennsylvania Route 356 through downtown on South Main Street.

North of the city of Butler, PA 8 meets U.S. Route 422 at an interchange. Near Moraine State Park, PA 8 meets Pennsylvania Route 528 and Pennsylvania Route 173. About 3 miles (4.8 km) east of Slippery Rock, PA 8 meets Pennsylvania Route 108. In the town of Harrisville, PA 8 intersects Pennsylvania Route 58 (Grove City Harrisville Road). A few miles north of the Butler-Venango county line, PA 8 meets Interstate 80 at exit 29 near Barkeyville.

==== Mae West Bend ====
About 0.5 miles (0.8 km) north of the interchange of PA 28 (in the borough of Etna) is a very sharp and hazardous curve, known to Pittsburghers as "Mae West Bend". The site of numerous accidents over the years, this curve has recently been widened by razing the deteriorating buildings along the inner edge of the curve and digging out the mountainside so that two lanes ran in each direction throughout the curve (southbound travelers previously had to merge left on the curve as the right lane ended).

=== Interstate 80 to Erie ===
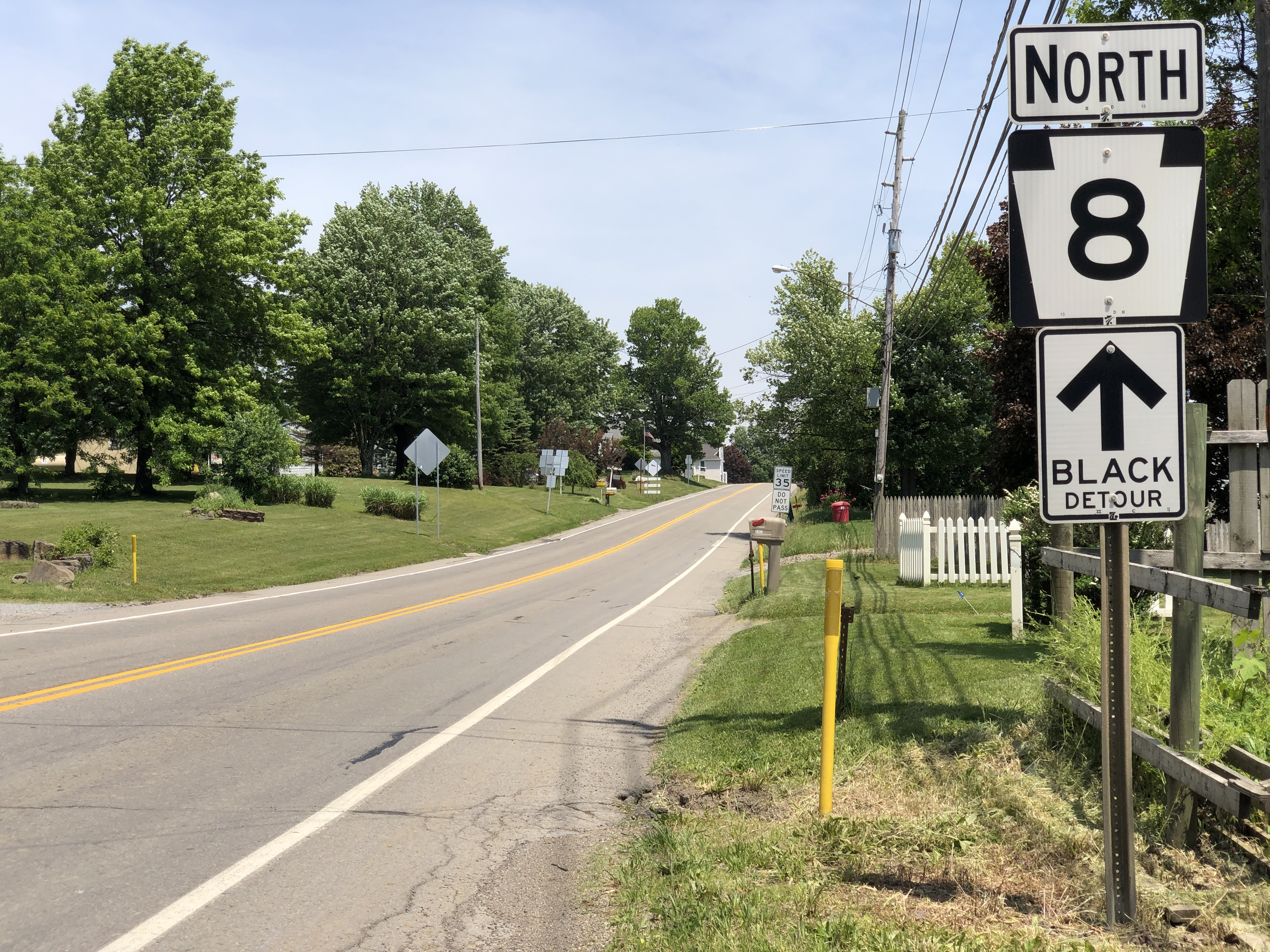
PA 8 northbound past PA 208 in Barkeyville

2 miles (3 km) north of I-80, PA 8 becomes a limited-access highway. The expressway, built between 1973-1976, is 9 miles (14 km) long and has only two exits, one of which serves as the northern terminus of Pennsylvania Route 308. North of the expressway, PA 8 is called Pittsburgh Road. South of Franklin, PA 8 merges with U.S. Route 62, beginning a 10-mile (16 km) concurrency with the route. In Franklin, PA 8 and US 62 meet U.S. Route 322 in the city center. The routes form a short, 0.5 miles (0.8 km) concurrency through the city before splitting near the Allegheny River. North of US 322, PA 8 and US 62 begin to parallel the Allegheny River. West of downtown Oil City, the concurrency with US 62 ends. US 62 crosses the Allegheny and runs south of the city before turning north towards the Allegheny National Forest and New York. PA 8, however, continues into Oil City, where PA 8 meets Pennsylvania Route 8 Business, the first of two auxiliary routes of PA 8, at Center Street. While PA 8 Business heads into Oil City, PA 8 runs west of the city along the former routing of Pennsylvania Route 8 Bypass, rejoining PA 8 Business at North Seneca Street north of town.

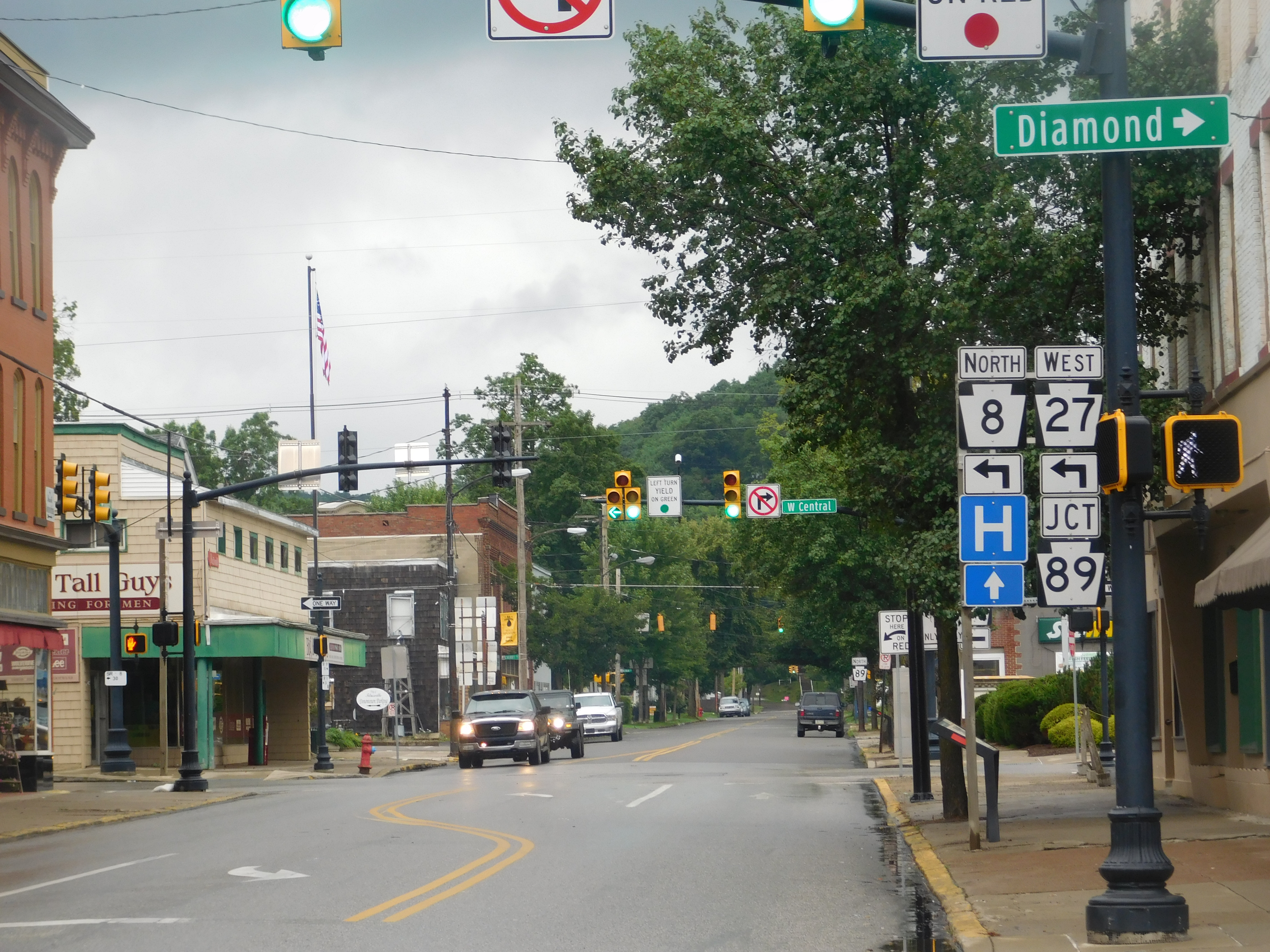
PA 8/PA 27 through Titusville

North of Oil City, PA 8 is named Oil City-Titusville Road. In the city of Titusville, PA 8 meets Pennsylvania Route 27 and the southern terminus of Pennsylvania Route 89 at the intersection of Franklin Street and Central Avenue. PA 8 forms a concurrency with PA 27 westward along the one-way streets of Central Avenue and Diamond Street before splitting at Spring Street.

In Riceville, PA 8 intersects Pennsylvania Route 77. 5 miles (8 km) north of PA 77, PA 8 enters Erie County. In Union City, PA 8 merges with U.S. Route 6 for 0.5 miles (0.8 km) through downtown. Just north of the split with US 6, PA 8 meets the southern terminus of the northern segment of Pennsylvania Route 97. PA 8 passes by a dry lake called Union City Lake south of Wattsburg, where it merges with Pennsylvania Route 89. The two routes run concurrent to one another through Wattsburg, where PA 8 and PA 89 meet the western terminus of Pennsylvania Route 474, to the Venango Township community of Lowville, where PA 8 breaks from PA 89, taking a more westerly routing than PA 89. PA 8 is named Wattsburg Road between Lowville and the Erie city line.

1.5 miles (2.4 km) southeast of Erie, PA 8 interchanges with Interstate 90 at exit 29, which shows a sign for Parade Street (northbound) and Hammett (southbound).

In the city itself, PA 8, as Pine Avenue, meets the northern terminus of Old French Road (PA 97) a mere 700 feet (210 m) south of its northern terminus at U.S. Route 20. PA 97 and PA 8 effectively join to become Parade Street, which continues north to Front Street, just south of the Bayfront Parkway.

== History ==
PA 8 was first signed in 1926 from West Virginia to Erie. South of Pittsburgh, PA 8 followed the current U.S. Route 19 alignment from the West Virginia state line to Canonsburg, as well as the present Pennsylvania Route 50 alignment from Bridgeville to Crafton. The West Virginia – Pittsburgh segment was decommissioned in 1930.

In 1934, construction began on PA 8 between the Allegheny–Butler county line and Three Degree Road. This segment opened in 1935. Later, in 1958, construction commenced on the segment from Grant Avenue to Pennsylvania Route 28 in Etna. In that same year, the route was widened and a median was installed from Franklin to Reno. The Grant Avenue – PA 28 segment was completed the following year. In 1961, PA 8 from the end of the Richard C. Frame Memorial Highway at Interstate 80 to Franklin was upgraded with a median, and, in 1968, the section from Reno to Oil City had a median installed as well.

In 1973, construction began on the section of expressway from Pennsylvania Route 308 in Pearl to the northern end of the present expressway south of Franklin in Venango County. That same year, the southern terminus of PA 8 was moved from West Carson Street in Pittsburgh to Pennsylvania Route 28 in Etna. In 1974, construction began on the remainder of the expressway from the present southern end at Wesley to PA 308. The highway was completed in 1976.

In 1977, the southern terminus was moved to its current location from PA 28 in Etna. In 1979, the route was realigned onto what was then PA 8 Bypass (Main Street) to bypass downtown Oil City. PA 8 Bypass, initially signed in 1941, was decommissioned while the former routing in PA 8 in Oil City became Pennsylvania Route 8 Business.

== Major intersections ==
County	Location	mi	km	Destinations	Notes
Allegheny	Wilkinsburg	0.000	0.000	I-376 / US 22 / US 30 west (Penn-Lincoln Parkway) – Pittsburgh, Monroeville US 30 east (Ardmore Boulevard)	Exit 78B on I-376, southern terminus of PA 8
Allegheny	Pittsburgh	2.462	3.962	PA 380 east (Dallas Avenue)	Southern end of concurrency with PA 380
Allegheny	Pittsburgh	2.747	4.421	PA 380 west (Penn Avenue) / Blue Belt (Fifth Avenue)	Northern end of concurrency with PA 380; southern end of concurrency with Blue Belt
Allegheny	Pittsburgh	4.988	8.027	PA 130 east / Green Belt (Allegheny River Boulevard) – Penn Hills	Southern end of concurrency with Green Belt; western terminus of PA 130
Allegheny	Pittsburgh	5.322	8.565	Blue Belt / Green Belt (Highland Park Bridge) to PA 28	Interchange; northern end of concurrency with Blue Belt / Green Belt
Allegheny	Allegheny River	6.641– 7.039	10.688– 11.328	Senator Robert D. Fleming Bridge	
Allegheny	Sharpsburg–Etna line	6.920	11.137	To PA 28 – Sharpsburg	Interchange; northbound exit and southbound entrance, via Bridge Street; Exit 5A on PA 28 north
Allegheny	Sharpsburg–Etna line	7.097	11.422	Sharpsburg	Interchange; southbound exit and northbound entrance
Allegheny	Sharpsburg–Etna– Shaler Township tripoint	7.248	11.665	PA 28 / Blue Belt (Allegheny Valley Expressway) – Pittsburgh, Kittanning	Interchange; southbound exit and northbound entrance; Exit 5B on PA 28
Allegheny	Hampton Township	12.509	20.131	Green Belt (Duncan Avenue)	Southern end of concurrency with Green Belt
Allegheny	Hampton Township	13.296	21.398	Green Belt (Harts Run Road)	Northern end of concurrency with Green Belt
Allegheny	Hampton Township	14.800	23.818	Yellow Belt (Wildwood Road) – North Park, Dorseyville	
Allegheny	Hampton Township	16.262	26.171	I-76 Toll / Penna Turnpike – Ohio, Pittsburgh	Exit 39 (Butler Valley) on Penna Turnpike; E-ZPass or toll-by-plate
Allegheny	Richland Township	17.937	28.867	PA 910 / Orange Belt (Gibsonia Road) – New Kensington, Pittsburgh International Airport	
Allegheny	Richland Township	19.072	30.693	Red Belt (Bakerstown Road) – Bakerstown, Tarentum, Warrendale	Interchange; no northbound exit
Butler	Middlesex Township	22.684	36.506	PA 228 west – Mars	Southern end of concurrency with PA 228
Butler	Middlesex Township	24.380	39.236	PA 228 east (Glade Mill Road) – Saxonburg, Ekastown	Northern end of concurrency with PA 228
Butler	Butler Township	31.535	50.751	AK Steel	Interchange
Butler	Butler	34.461	55.460	PA 356 south (Wayne Street)	Southern end of concurrency with PA 356
Butler	Butler	34.653– 34.736	55.769– 55.902	PA 68 / PA 356 north (Cunningham Street / Jefferson Street)	Northern end of concurrency with PA 356
Butler	Butler Township	36.055	58.025	US 422 (Benjamin Franklin Highway) – Kittanning, New Castle	Interchange
Butler	Center Township	37.523	60.387	PA 308 north (West Sunbury Road) – West Sunbury	Southern terminus of PA 308
Butler	Clay Township	43.888	70.631	PA 138 north (Euclid Road) – West Sunbury	Southern terminus of PA 138
Butler	Brady Township	47.044	75.710	PA 528 south (Prospect Road) – Prospect, Moraine State Park	Northern terminus of PA 528
Butler	Brady Township	47.177	75.924	PA 173 north – Slippery Rock	Southern terminus of PA 173
Butler	Slippery Rock Township	52.891	85.120	PA 108 west – Slippery Rock	Eastern terminus of PA 108
Butler	Harrisville	55.888	89.943	PA 58 (Mercer Street) – Eau Claire, Grove City	
Venango	Barkeyville	59.985	96.536	PA 208 (Clintonville Road / Barkeyville Road) – Clintonville, Grove City	
Venango	Barkeyville	60.866	97.954	I-80 – Clarion, Sharon	Exit 29 on I-80
Venango	Irwin Township	63.322	101.907	Southern end of freeway	
Venango	Irwin Township	63.322	101.907	Nectarine, Wesley	Southbound exit and northbound entrance, via Georgetown Road
Venango	Irwin Township	66.190	106.522	PA 308 south – Pearl, Bullion	Northern terminus of PA 308
Venango	Sandycreek Township	73.458	118.219	Northern end of freeway	
Venango	Frenchcreek Township	76.015	122.334	US 62 south – Mercer	Southern end of concurrency with US 62
Venango	Franklin	77.512	124.743	US 322 west (13th Street) to PA 417	Southern end of concurrency with US 322
Venango	Franklin	77.952	125.452	US 322 east (Liberty Street)	Northern end of concurrency with US 322
Venango	Oil City	85.484	137.573	US 62 north (Petroleum Street) – Tionesta PA 428 north (Halyday Street)	Northern end of concurrency with US 62; southern terminus of PA 428
Venango	Oil City	85.705	137.929	PA 8 Bus. north (Center Street)	Southern terminus of PA 8 Bus.
Venango	Oil City	86.436	139.105	PA 8 Bus. south (Seneca Street)	Northern terminus of PA 8 Bus.
Venango	Rouseville	88.838	142.971	PA 227 east (Cherry Run Road)	Western terminus of PA 227
Venango	Cherrytree Township	93.600	150.635	PA 417 south – Dempseytown, Franklin	Northern terminus of PA 417
Crawford	Titusville	100.518	161.768	PA 8 Truck north / PA 27 Truck west (St. John Street)	Southern terminus of PA 8 Truck; eastern terminus of PA 27 Truck
Crawford	Titusville	100.753– 100.798	162.146– 162.219	PA 27 east (Diamond Street / Central Avenue) PA 89 north (North Franklin Street)	Southern end of concurrency with PA 27; southern terminus of PA 89
Crawford	Titusville	100.985	162.520	PA 8 Truck south (South Perry Street)	Northern terminus of PA 8 Truck; western terminus of PA 27 Truck
Crawford	Titusville	101.187	162.845	PA 27 west (West Central Avenue) – Meadville	Northern end of concurrency with PA 27
Crawford	Hydetown	103.554	166.654	PA 408 west (Main Street) – Hydetown	Eastern terminus of PA 408
Crawford	Bloomfield Township	113.985	183.441	PA 77 – Spartansburg, Meadville	
Erie	Union City	122.291	196.808	US 6 west (Meadville Road) – Meadville	Southern end of concurrency with US 6
Erie	Union City	122.933	197.841	US 6 east (East High Street) – Corry	Northern end of concurrency with US 6
Erie	Union City	123.092	198.097	PA 97 north (Perry Street) to I-90	Southern terminus of PA 97
Erie	Amity Township	130.771	210.456	PA 89 south – Corry	Southern end of concurrency with PA 89
Erie	Wattsburg	131.290	211.291	PA 474 east – Clymer, Jamestown	Western terminus of PA 474
Erie	Venango Township	132.854	213.808	PA 89 north – North East	Northern end of concurrency with PA 89
Erie	Millcreek Township	145.298– 145.315	233.834– 233.862	I-90 – Buffalo, Cleveland	Louis A. Magnano Interchange; Exit 29 on I-90
Erie	Erie	148.675	239.269	PA 97 south (Old French Road)	Northern terminus of PA 97
Erie	Erie	148.807	239.482	US 20 (East 26th Street)	Northern terminus of PA 8
1.000 mi = 1.609 km; 1.000 km = 0.621 mi: Concurrency terminus; Electronic toll collection; Incomplete access

== Special routes ==
=== PA 8 Business ===
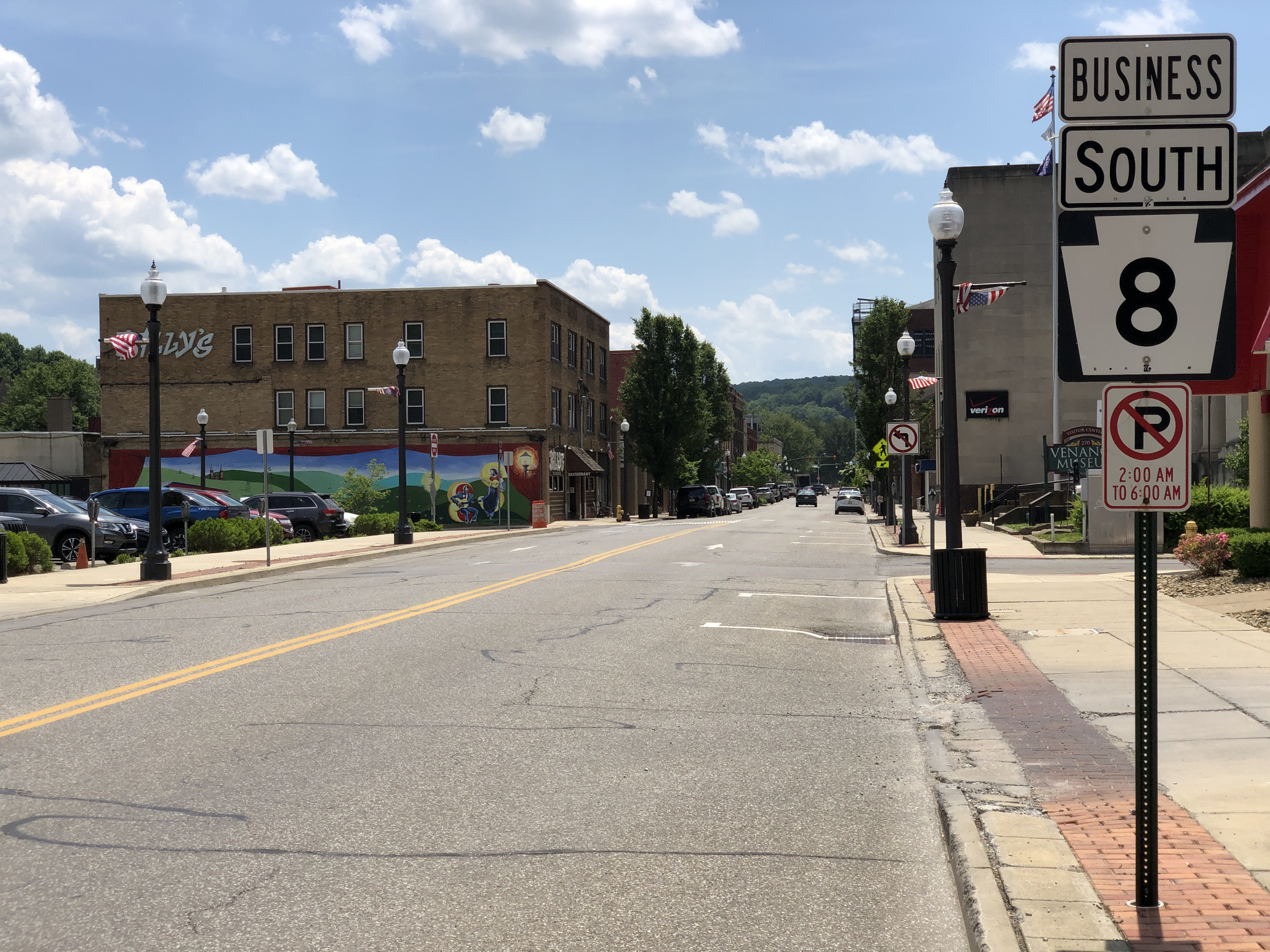
PA 8 Bus. southbound in Oil City

Pennsylvania Route 8 Business
- Location: Oil City, Pennsylvania
- Existed: 2000–present

Pennsylvania Route 8 Business is a 1-mile-long (1.6 km) business route in Venango County, Pennsylvania.

In 1979, a two-lane but development-free bypass of Oil City was constructed on the westbank of Oil Creek and featured the designation of Pennsylvania Route 8 Bypass. The original eastbank sector and its two bridges were initially kept as mainline Route 8. The first half of the very short route features one-way couples through the heart of the municipality, and the northern half features a single, business-lined two-lane street. Mainline Route 8 was redirected to the former bypass upon the commissioning of Route 8 Business.

=== PA 8 Truck ===
Pennsylvania Route 8 Truck
- Location: Titusville, Pennsylvania
- Existed: 1980–present

Pennsylvania Route 8 Truck is a 1/2-mile-long (0.80 km) truck route in Titusville, Crawford County, Pennsylvania. In 1980, the designation was established to remove trucks from the complicated intersection with Pennsylvania Route 27 and to provide direct access for local trucks past the borough's small industrial area along St. John Street. For its entire length it is cosigned with Truck Route 27.

=== PA 8 Alternate Truck ===
PA Route 8 Alternate Truck
- Location: Crawford County, Pennsylvania
- Existed: 2013–present

Pennsylvania Route 8 Alternate Truck is a truck route around a weight-restricted bridge over the East Branch of the Oil Creek, on which trucks over 32 tons and combination loads over 40 tons are prohibited. The route follows PA 408 and PA 77 and was signed in 2013.

=== PA 8 Bypass ===
Pennsylvania Route 8 Bypass
- Location: Oil City, Pennsylvania
- Existed: 1979–2000

Pennsylvania Route 8 Bypass was the original designation for PA 8 Business. PA 8 Bypass was signed in 1979, but was decommissioned and renamed PA 8 Business in 2000.
