= Chapmanville =

Chapmanville may refer to:

- Chapmanville, a village in Plum Township in Venango County, Pennsylvania
- Chapmanville, West Virginia
- Chapmanville is a historic place name for Chapmantown, a neighborhood in Chico, California
