= Troy Township, Pennsylvania =

Troy Township is the name of some places in the U.S. state of Pennsylvania:

- Troy Township, Bradford County, Pennsylvania
- Troy Township, Crawford County, Pennsylvania
