= Pennsylvania Route 417 =

State highway in Venango County, Pennsylvania, US

Pennsylvania Route 417

Route information
- Maintained by PennDOT
- Length: 12.12 mi (19.51 km)
- Existed: 1936–present

Major junctions
- South end: US 322 in Franklin
- PA 428 in Oakland Township
- North end: PA 8 in Cherrytree Township

Location
- Country: United States
- State: Pennsylvania
- Counties: Venango

Highway system
- Pennsylvania State Route System; Interstate; US; State; Scenic; Legislative
← PA 416	→ PA 418

Pennsylvania Route 417 (PA 417) is a 12-mile-long (19 km) state highway located in Venango County in Pennsylvania. The southern terminus is at US 322 in Franklin. The northern terminus is at PA 8 in Cherrytree Township.

== Route description ==
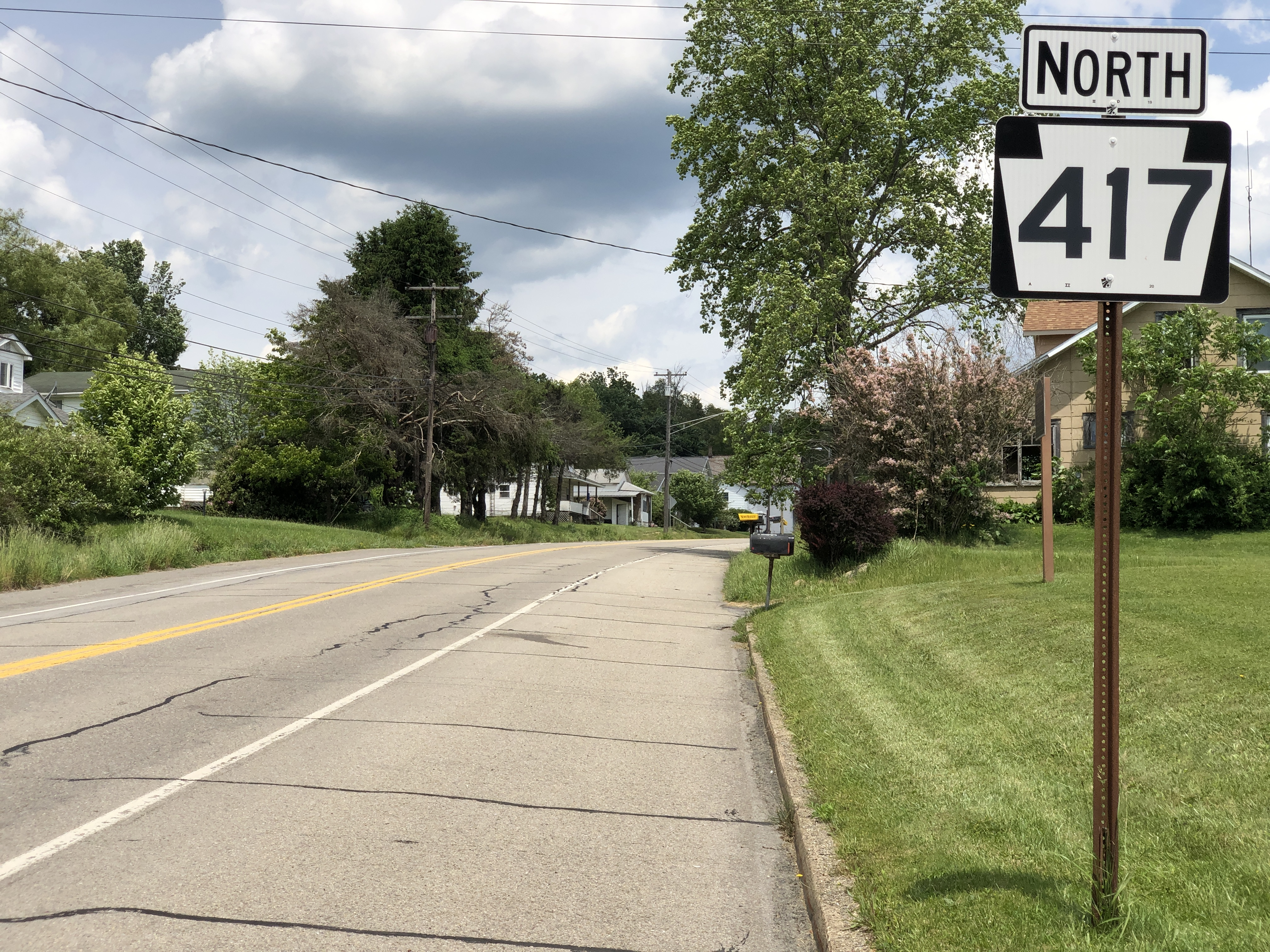
PA 417 northbound in Oakland Township

PA 417 begins at an intersection with US 322 on the border of the city of Franklin and the borough of Sugarcreek, heading northeast on two-lane undivided Rocky Grove Avenue into Sugarcreek. The road passes through residential areas prior to turning north into forests and becoming an unnamed road. The route continues through a mix of woodland, farmland, and rural residences, heading into Oakland Township and curving northeast. PA 417 continues through more rural areas, passing through Dempseytown before forming a brief concurrency with PA 428 near Baums Corners. At this point, the route turns more to the east through more areas of farms and forests with some homes. PA 417 turns to the northeast and crosses into Cherrytree Township, continuing to its terminus at PA 8.

== Major intersections ==
The entire route is in Venango County.

Location	mi	km	Destinations	Notes
Franklin–Sugarcreek line	0.00	0.00	US 322 (Grant Street / North 13th Street) to US 62 / PA 8	Southern terminus
Oakland Township	8.49	13.66	PA 428 south – Oil City	South end of PA 428 concurrency
Oakland Township	8.67	13.95	PA 428 north (Wallaceville Road)	North end of PA 428 concurrency
Cherrytree Township	12.12	19.51	PA 8 (William Flinn Highway) – Oil City, Titusville	Northern terminus
1.000 mi = 1.609 km; 1.000 km = 0.621 mi: Concurrency terminus
