= Pennsylvania Route 27 =

State highway in Pennsylvania, US

Pennsylvania Route 27
- Map of western Pennsylvania with PA 27 in red and PA 27 Truck in blue

Route information
- Maintained by PennDOT
- Length: 65.7 mi (105.7 km)

Major junctions
- West end: SR 1001 (Park Avenue) in Meadville
- PA 8 in Titusville; PA 36 in Pleasantville; US 6 near Youngsville
- East end: PA 69 near Sugar Grove

Location
- Country: United States
- State: Pennsylvania
- Counties: Crawford, Venango, Warren

Highway system
- Pennsylvania State Route System; Interstate; US; State; Scenic; Legislative
| ← PA 26 | → PA 28 |
| ← PA 46 | → PA 48 |

Pennsylvania Route 27 (PA 27) is a 65.7-mile-long (105.7 km) state highway that is located in northwest Pennsylvania in the United States.

The western terminus of the route is situated at Park Avenue near U.S. Route 6 (US 6) and U.S. 19 in Meadville. The eastern terminus is located at PA 69, three miles (5 km) south of Sugar Grove.

== History ==
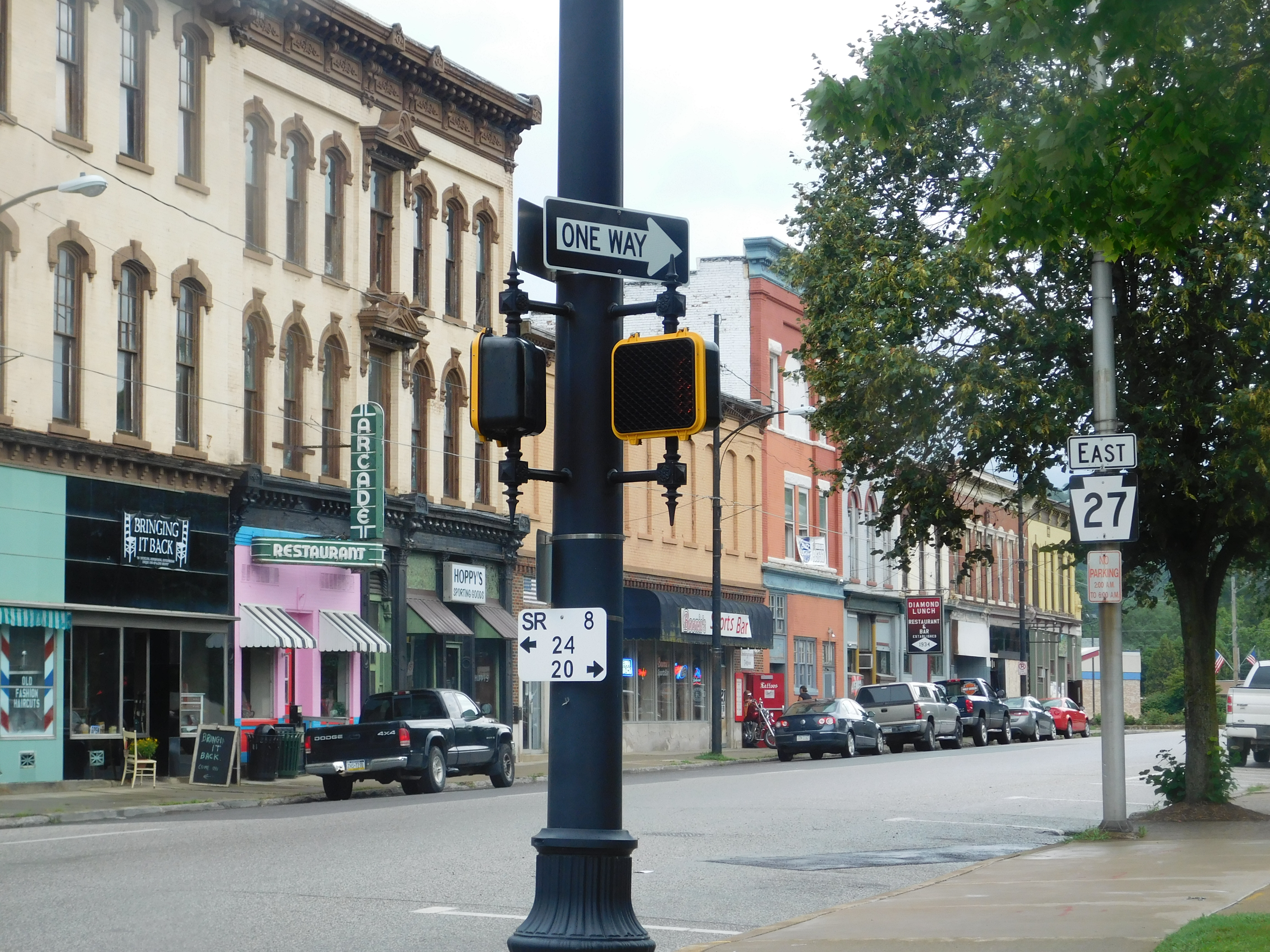
PA 27 eastbound in Titusville

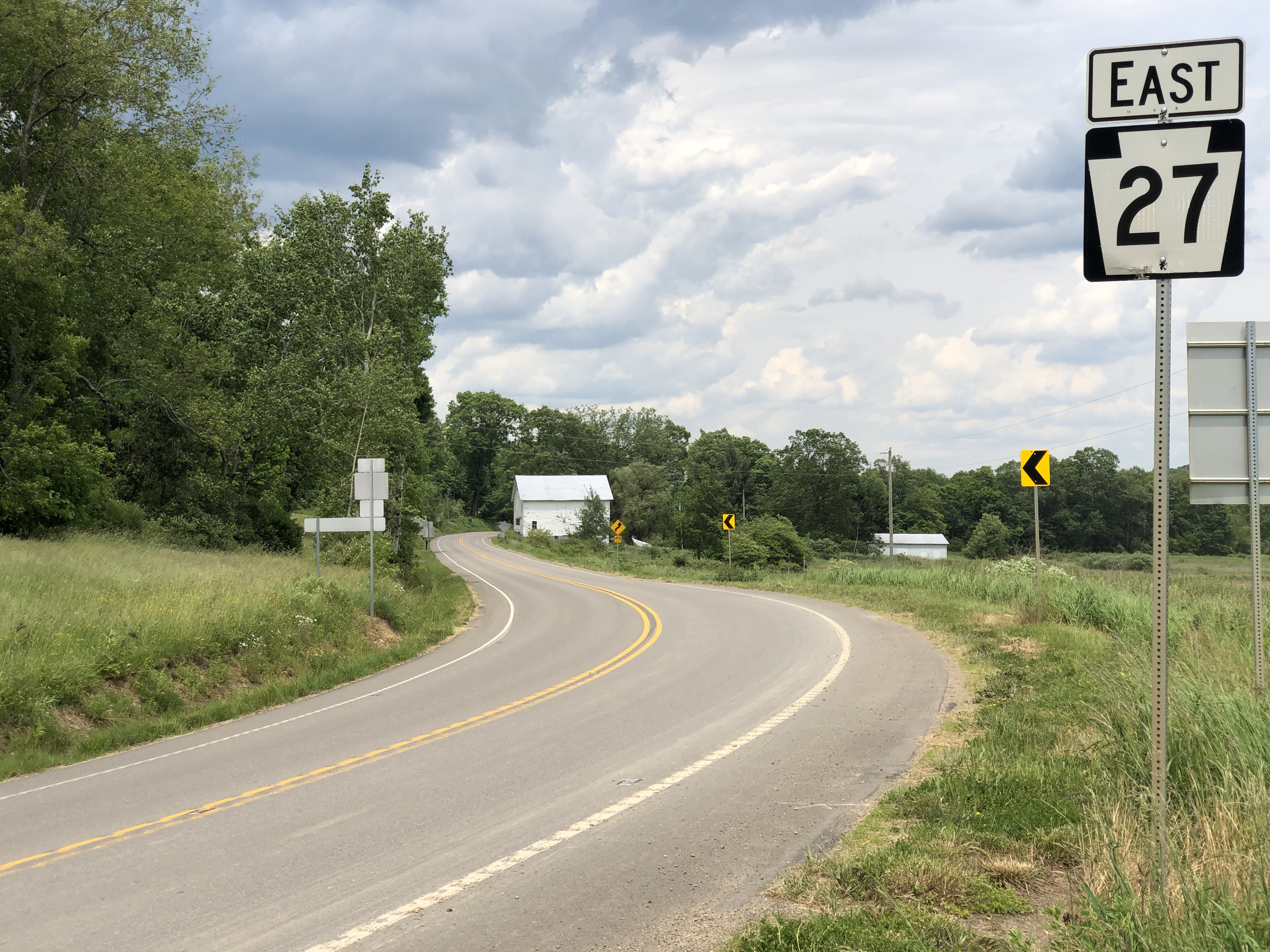
PA 27 eastbound past PA 427 in Troy Township

From 1927 to 1928, PA 27 between U.S. Route 322 in Meadville and US 6 in the Pittsfield Township community of Pittsfield was known as the western segment of Pennsylvania Route 47. In 1928, west PA 47 was decommissioned and replaced with PA 27.

In April 2003, the western terminus of the route was moved from US 6 and US 19 to Park Avenue, which had been the western terminus of PA 27 from 1928 to 1974. However, west of Park Avenue, PA 27 is still signed along North Street Market Street, Terrace Street and Reynolds Avenue. to connect with US 6 and US 19.

== Major intersections ==
| County | Location | mi | km | Destinations | Notes |
|---|---|---|---|---|---|
| Crawford | Meadville | 0.000 | 0.000 | SR 1001 (Park Avenue) | Western terminus |
| Crawford | Meadville | 0.122 | 0.196 | PA 86 north (North Main Street) | Southern terminus of PA 86 |
| Crawford | Meadville | 0.762 | 1.226 | PA 77 east (Hickory Street) | Western terminus of PA 77 |
| Crawford | Randolph Township | 11.395 | 18.338 | PA 173 south – Cochranton | Northern terminus of PA 173 |
| Crawford | Randolph Township | 12.459 | 20.051 | PA 198 west – Saegertown | Eastern terminus of PA 198 |
| Crawford | Troy Township | 16.448 | 26.470 | PA 427 south – Cooperstown | Northern terminus of PA 427 |
| Venango | Plum Township | 20.639 | 33.215 | PA 428 north – Townville | Western end of concurrency with PA 428 |
| Venango | Plum Township | 20.741 | 33.379 | PA 428 south – Oil City | Eastern end of concurrency with PA 428 |
| Crawford | Titusville | 27.152 | 43.697 | PA 8 north (West Spring Street) – Union City | Western end of concurrency with PA 8 |
| Crawford | Titusville | 27.362 | 44.035 | PA 8 Truck (South Perry Street) | Northern terminus of PA 8 Truck |
| Crawford | Titusville | 27.594 | 44.408 | PA 8 south (South Franklin Street) / PA 89 north (North Franklin Street) | Eastern end of concurrency with PA 8; southern terminus of PA 89 |
| Venango | Oilcreek Township | 32.507 | 52.315 | PA 227 west – Rouseville | Western end of concurrency with PA 277 |
| Venango | Pleasantville | 33.205 | 53.438 | PA 36 south – Tionesta | Northern terminus of PA 36 |
| Venango | Pleasantville | 33.381 | 53.722 | PA 227 east – Neilltown | Eastern end of concurrency with PA 277 |
| Warren | Pittsfield Township | 51.937 | 83.584 | PA 426 north – Corry | Southern terminus of PA 426 |
| Warren | Pittsfield Township | 55.498 | 89.315 | US 6 west – Corry | Western end of concurrency with US 6 |
| Warren | Youngsville | 58.164 | 93.606 | US 6 east | Eastern end of concurrency with US 6 |
| Warren | Sugar Grove Township | 65.889 | 106.038 | PA 69 (Jackson Run Road) – North Warren, Sugar Grove, Jamestown | Eastern terminus |
1.000 mi = 1.609 km; 1.000 km = 0.621 mi: Concurrency terminus

== PA 27 Truck ==
Pennsylvania Route 27 Truck
- Location: Titusville, Pennsylvania
- Existed: 1980–present

Pennsylvania Route 27 Truck is a 1/2-mile-long (0.80 km) truck route in Crawford County, Pennsylvania. In 1980, the designation was established to remove trucks from the complicated intersection with Pennsylvania Route 8 and to provide direct access for local trucks past the Titusville's small industrial area along St. John Street. For its entire length it is cosigned with Truck Route 8.
