= Woodcock, Pennsylvania =

Borough in Pennsylvania, US

- Borough
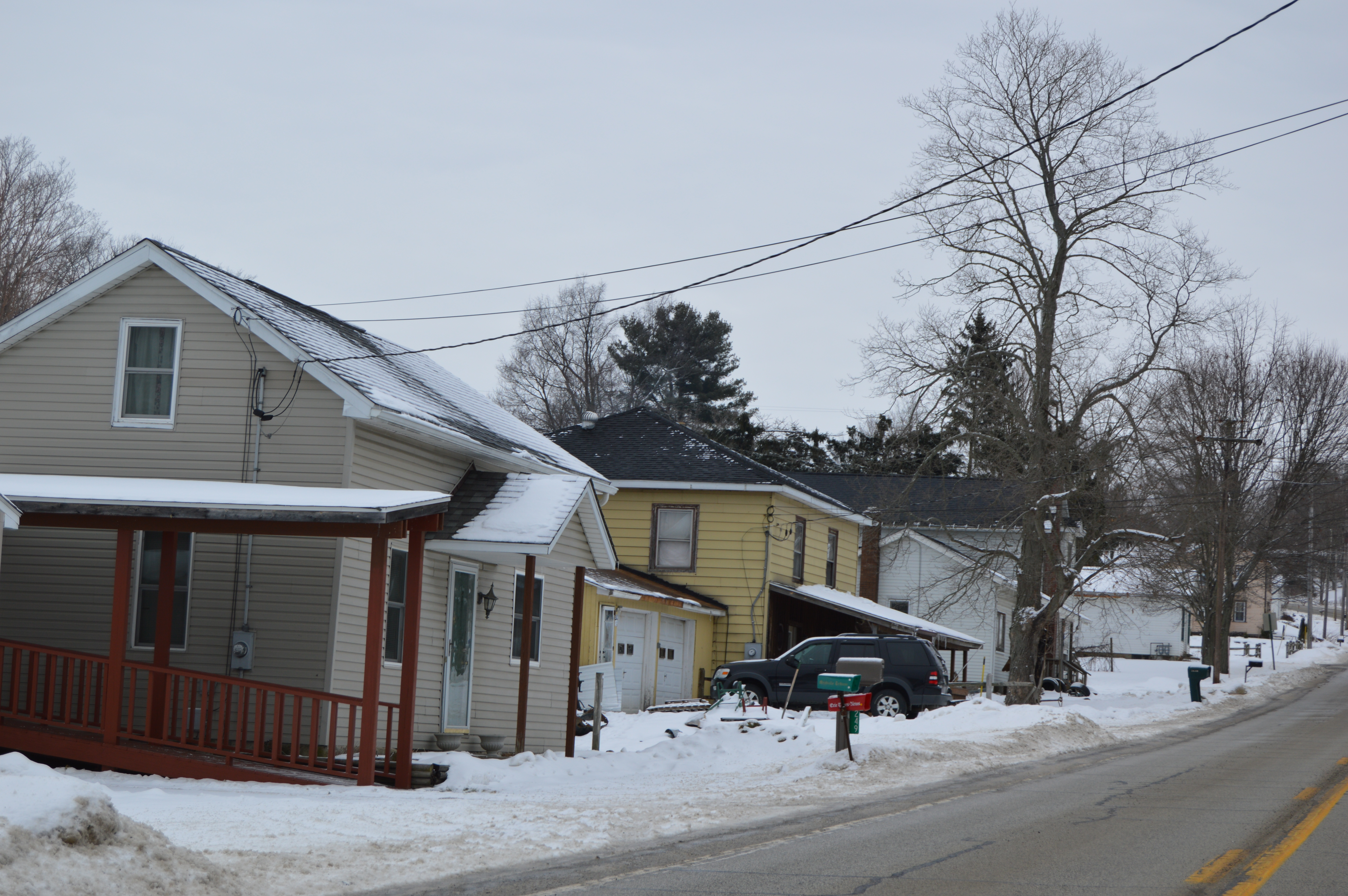
- Houses on South Main Street (PA 86)

- Location of Woodcock in Crawford County, Pennsylvania.

- Location of Woodcock in Pennsylvania
- Coordinates: 41°45′17″N 80°5′8″W
- Country: United States
- State: Pennsylvania
- County: Crawford
- Founded: 1844

Area
  - Total: 0.67 sq mi (1.73 km^{2})
  - Land: 0.67 sq mi (1.73 km^{2})
  - Water: 0 sq mi (0.00 km^{2})
- Elevation (middle of borough): 1,205 ft (367 m)
- Highest elevation (northeast corner of borough): 1,442 ft (440 m)
- Lowest elevation (Gravel Run): 1,180 ft (360 m)

Population (2020)
  - Total: 140
  - Estimate (2022): 138
  - Density: 223.4/sq mi (86.26/km^{2})
- Time zone: UTC-4 (EST)
  - Summer (DST): UTC-5 (EDT)
- Area code: 814
- FIPS code: 42-86160

Woodcock is a borough in Crawford County, Pennsylvania, United States. The population was 140 at the 2020 census, down from 157 at the 2010 census.

== Geography ==
Woodcock is located in north-central Crawford County at 41°45′17″N 80°5′4″W (41.754726, -80.084569). It is bordered to the west, south, and east by Woodcock Township and to the north by Cambridge Township. Woodcock is in the valley of Gravel Run, which flows west for approximately 1 mile (1.6 km) to French Creek, a tributary of the Allegheny River.

Pennsylvania Route 86 passes through the borough, leading northeast 4 miles (6 km) to Cambridge Springs and southwest 9 miles (14 km) to Meadville, the county seat.

According to the United States Census Bureau, the borough has a total area of 0.66 square miles (1.72 km^{2}), all land.

== Demographics ==
Historical population
Census	Pop.	Note	%±
1850	215		—
1860	228		6.0%
1870	220		−3.5%
1880	184		−16.4%
1890	140		−23.9%
1900	109		−22.1%
1910	130		19.3%
1920	81		−37.7%
1930	104		28.4%
1940	119		14.4%
1950	130		9.2%
1960	123		−5.4%
1970	108		−12.2%
1980	126		16.7%
1990	148		17.5%
2000	146		−1.4%
2010	157		7.5%
2020	141		−10.2%
2022 (est.)	138	▼	−2.1%

As of the census of 2000, there were 146 people, 55 households, and 44 families residing in the borough. The population density was 260.2 inhabitants per square mile (100.5/km^{2}). There were 57 housing units at an average density of 101.6 per square mile (39.2/km^{2}). The racial makeup of the borough was 97.95% White, 2.05% from other races.

There were 55 households, out of which 36.4% had children under the age of 18 living with them, 69.1% were married couples living together, 7.3% had a female householder with no husband present, and 20.0% were non-families. 14.5% of all households were made up of individuals, and 3.6% had someone living alone who was 65 years of age or older. The average household size was 2.65 and the average family size was 2.93.

In the borough the population was spread out, with 20.5% under the age of 18, 8.2% from 18 to 24, 36.3% from 25 to 44, 29.5% from 45 to 64, and 5.5% who were 65 years of age or older. The median age was 38 years. For every 100 females there were 87.2 males. For every 100 females age 18 and over, there were 90.2 males.

The median income for a household in the borough was $50,500, and the median income for a family was $56,250. Males had a median income of $31,667 versus $32,250 for females. The per capita income for the borough was $19,577. There were none of the families and 2.6% of the population living below the poverty line, including no under eighteens and none of those over 64.
