= Sugar Grove Township, Warren County, Pennsylvania =

Township in Pennsylvania, United States

Coordinates: 41°58′00″N 79°21′59″W

Sugar Grove Township Seneca: Jöëdzë́'šo
- Township
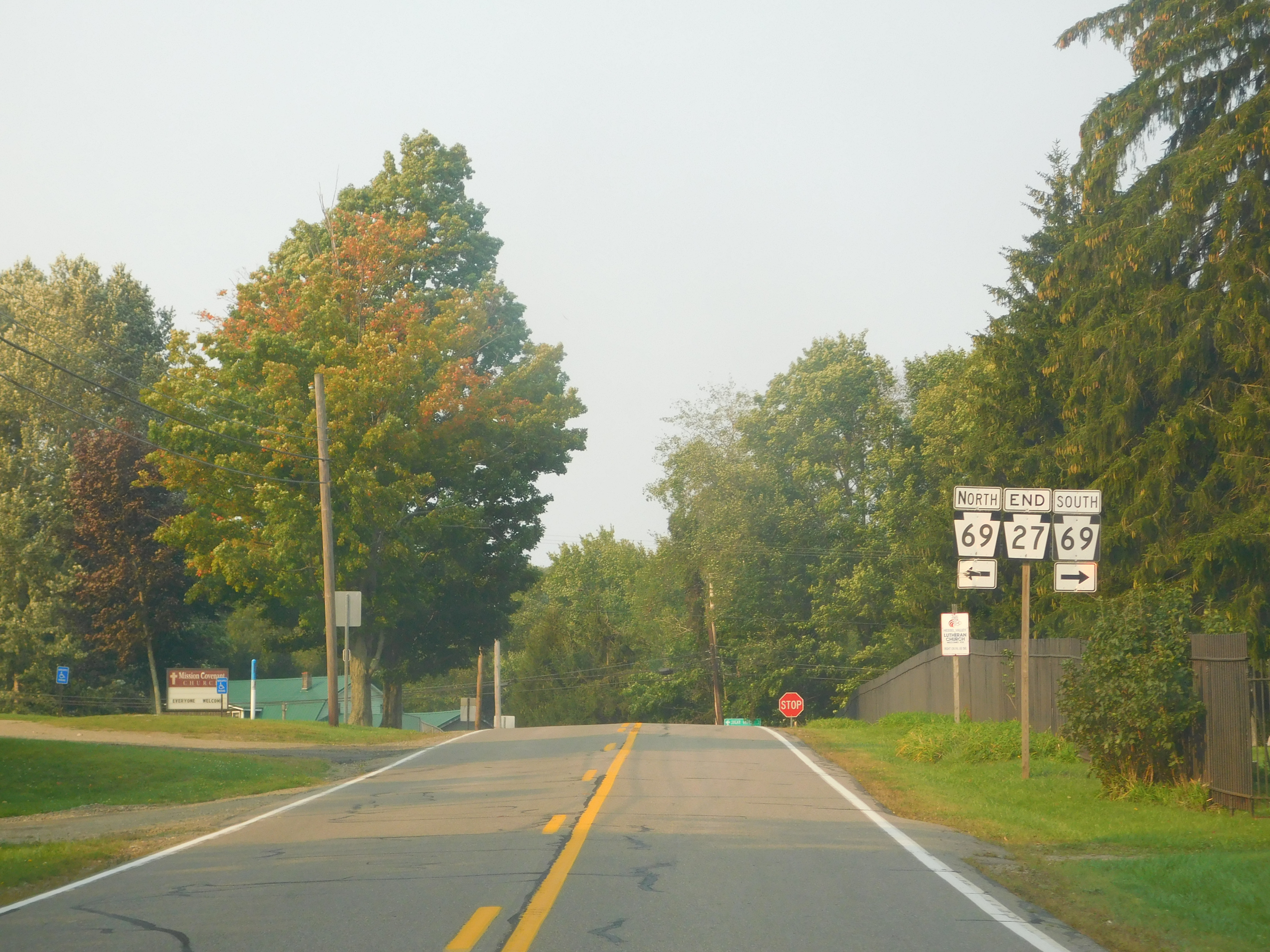
- Eastbound PA 27 ending at PA 69 in the township

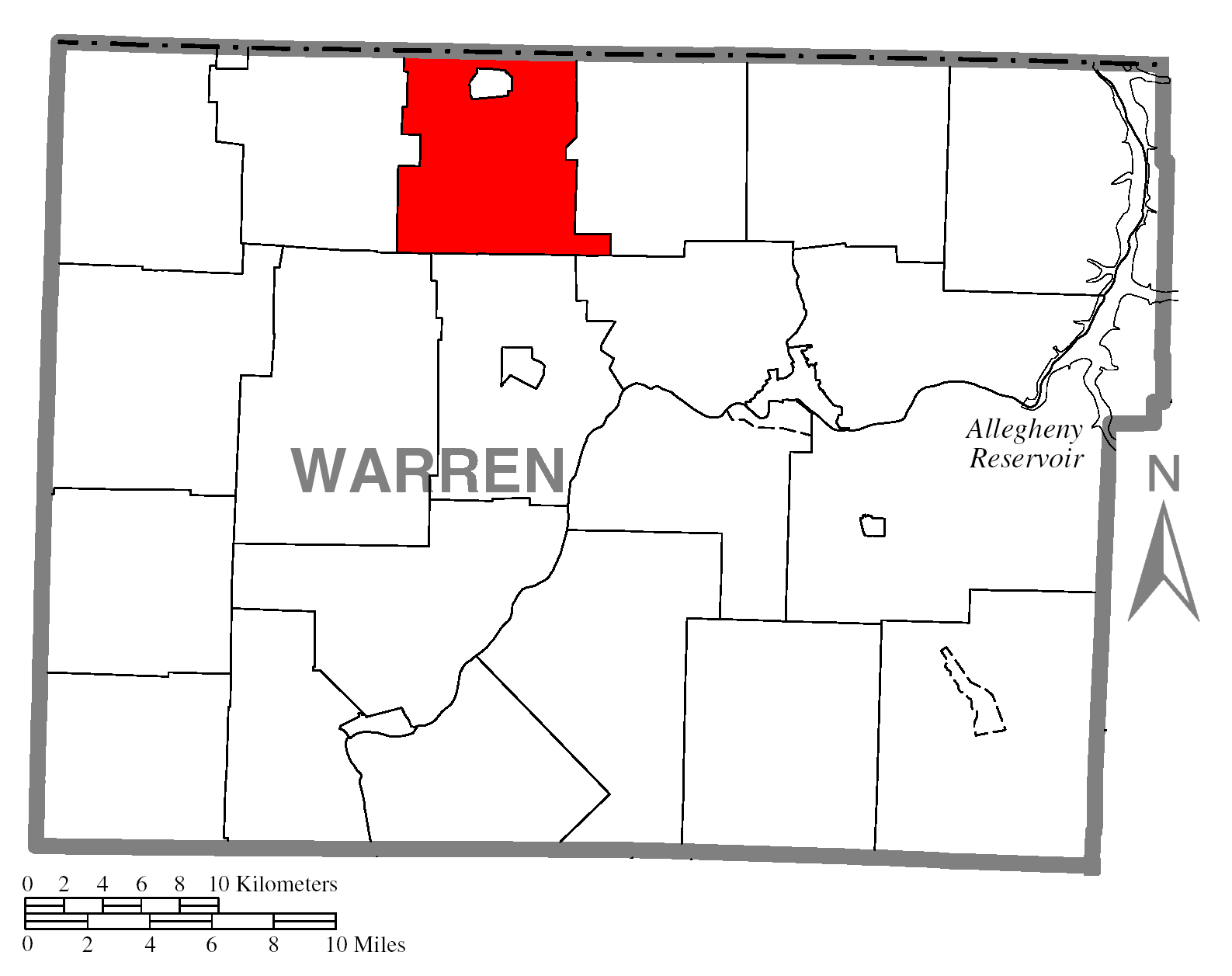
- Location of Sugar Grove Township in Warren County

- Location of Warren County in Pennsylvania
- Country: United States
- State: Pennsylvania
- County: Warren

Area
  - Total: 35.40 sq mi (91.69 km^{2})
  - Land: 35.37 sq mi (91.61 km^{2})
  - Water: 0.035 sq mi (0.09 km^{2})

Population (2020)
  - Total: 1,615
  - Estimate (2023): 1,569
  - Density: 47.0/sq mi (18.16/km^{2})
- Time zone: UTC-4 (EST)
  - Summer (DST): UTC-5 (EDT)
- Area code: 814
- FIPS code: 42-123-75032

Sugar Grove Township (Seneca: Jöëdzë́'šo) is a township in Warren County, Pennsylvania, United States. The population was 1,615 at the 2020 census, down from 1,723 at the 2010 census.

== Geography ==
According to the United States Census Bureau, the township has a total area of 35.5 square miles (92.0 km^{2}), of which 35.5 square miles (92.0 km^{2}) is land and 0.04 square mile (0.1 km^{2}) (0.08%) is water.

== Demographics ==
Historical population
Census	Pop.	Note	%±
2000	1,870		—
2010	1,723		−7.9%
2020	1,615		−6.3%
2023 (est.)	1,569		−2.8%
U.S. Decennial Census

As of the census of 2000, there were 1,870 people, 649 households, and 499 families residing in the township. The population density was 52.7 inhabitants per square mile (20.3/km^{2}). There were 705 housing units at an average density of 19.9/sq mi (7.7/km^{2}). The racial makeup of the township was 98.98% White, 0.21% African American, 0.32% Native American, 0.05% Asian, and 0.43% from two or more races. Hispanic or Latino of any race were 0.16% of the population.

There were 649 households, out of which 36.2% had children under the age of 18 living with them, 64.3% were married couples living together, 7.9% had a female householder with no husband present, and 23.0% were non-families. 19.0% of all households were made up of individuals, and 6.5% had someone living alone who was 65 years of age or older. The average household size was 2.88 and the average family size was 3.28.

In the township the population was spread out, with 30.7% under the age of 18, 9.1% from 18 to 24, 26.2% from 25 to 44, 23.1% from 45 to 64, and 10.9% who were 65 years of age or older. The median age was 35 years. For every 100 females, there were 104.1 males. For every 100 females age 18 and over, there were 101.1 males.

The median income for a household in the township was $37,931, and the median income for a family was $39,659. Males had a median income of $33,200 versus $22,188 for females. The per capita income for the township was $13,963. About 10.0% of families and 14.0% of the population were below the poverty line, including 21.4% of those under age 18 and 8.5% of those age 65 or over.

== Communities and locations ==
- Chandlers Valley - A village on Pennsylvania Route 69 in the southeastern part of the township.
- Ericsons Corners - A location on Deer Run Road in the south-central part of the township.
- Frodelius Corners - A location at Pennsylvania Route 957 and Page Hollow Road, west of Sugar Grove.
- Gourleys Corner - A location on Page Hollow Road in the western part of the township.
- Nuttall - A village south of Gourleys Corner, at the corner of Page Hollow Road and Stilson Hill Road.
- Sheldon Corners - A location at Bull Hill Road and Stilson Hill Road, south of Nuttall.
- Sugar Grove - A borough in the north-central part of the township, at Route 69 and Route 957.
- Swede Church Corners - A location at Pennsylvania Route 27 and Route 69, northwest of Chandlers Valley.
