= Riceville, Pennsylvania =

Unincorporated community in Pennsylvania, US

- Census-designated place
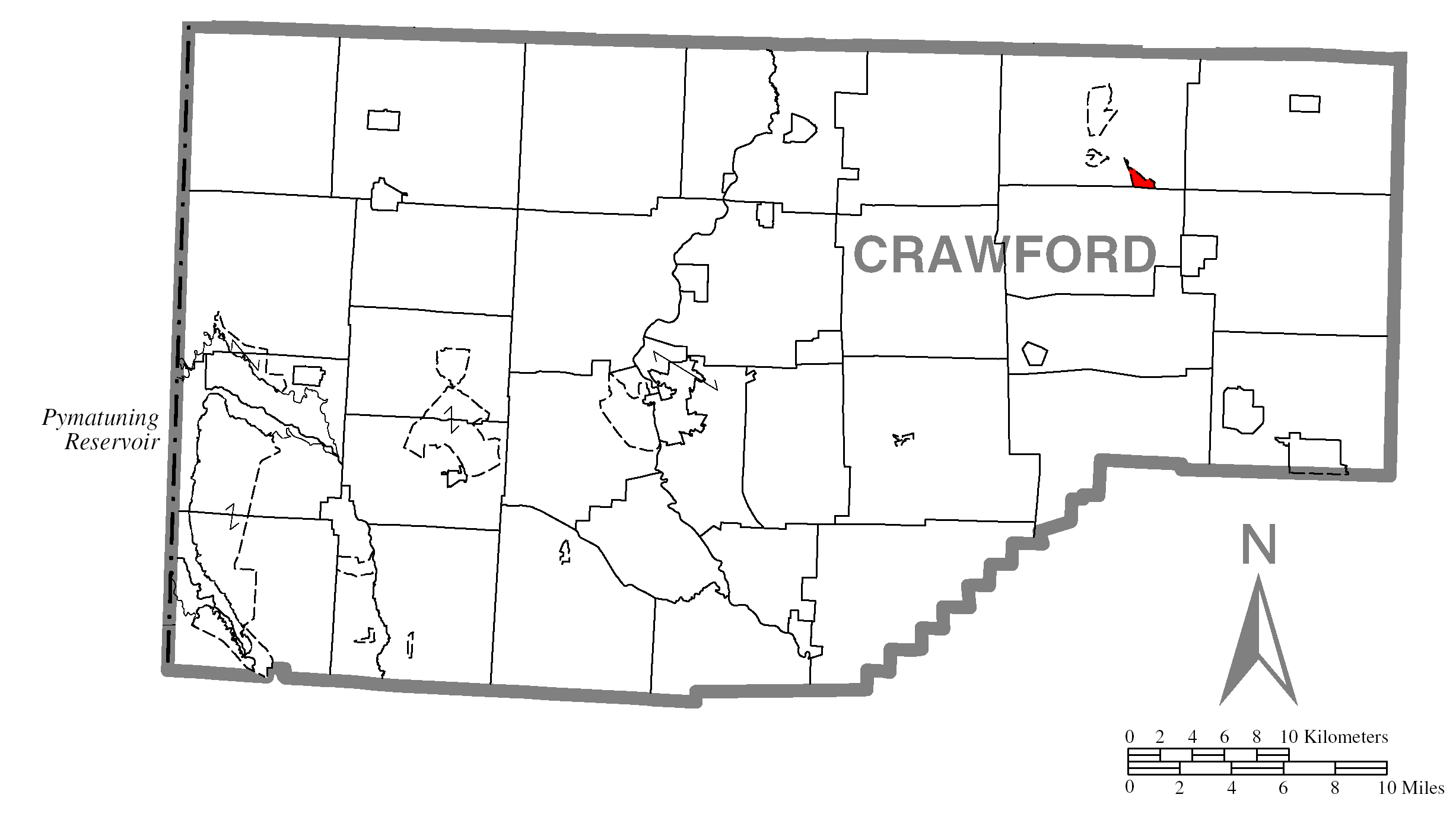
- Location of Riceville in Crawford County

- Location of Crawford County in Pennsylvania
- Coordinates: 41°46′36″N 79°48′3″W
- Country: United States
- State: Pennsylvania
- County: Crawford County
- Township: Bloomfield

Area
  - Total: 0.43 sq mi (1.12 km^{2})
  - Land: 0.43 sq mi (1.12 km^{2})
  - Water: 0 sq mi (0.00 km^{2})
- Elevation: 1,356 ft (413 m)

Population (2020)
  - Total: 58
  - Density: 134.7/sq mi (51.99/km^{2})
- Time zone: UTC-4 (EST)
  - Summer (DST): UTC-5 (EDT)
- Area code: 814
- FIPS code: 42-64440

Riceville is a census-designated place in Crawford County, Pennsylvania, United States. The population was 68 at the 2010 census.

== Geography ==
Riceville is located in northeastern Crawford County at 41°46′36″N 79°48′3″W (41.776636, -79.800740), in southeastern Bloomfield Township. It is on the southern side of Oil Creek, a tributary of the Allegheny River. Pennsylvania Route 77 passes through the community, leading northeast 1 mile (1.6 km) to Pennsylvania Route 8 and 7.5 miles (12.1 km) to Spartansburg, and southwest 20 miles (32 km) to Meadville, the Crawford County seat.

According to the United States Census Bureau, the CDP has a total area of 0.42 square miles (1.1 km^{2}), all land.

== Demographics ==
Historical population
Census	Pop.	Note	%±
2020	58		—
U.S. Decennial Census

At the 2000 census, there were 82 people, 29 households, and 24 families in the CDP. The population density was 192.7 inhabitants per square mile (74.4/km^{2}). There were 32 housing units at an average density of 75.2 per square mile (29.0/km^{2}). The racial makeup of the CDP was 100.00% White. There were 29 households, 44.8% had children under the age of 18 living with them, 58.6% were married couples living together, 13.8% had a female householder with no husband present, and 17.2% were non-families. 17.2% of households were made up of individuals, and 10.3% were one person aged 65 or older. The average household size was 2.83 and the average family size was 3.04.

The age distribution was 26.8% under the age of 18, 6.1% from 18 to 24, 35.4% from 25 to 44, 22.0% from 45 to 64, and 9.8% 65 or older. The median age was 37 years. For every 100 females, there were 127.8 males. For every 100 females age 18 and over, there were 140.0 males.

The median household income was $42,500 and the median family income was $45,938. Males had a median income of $28,750 versus $23,125 for females. The per capita income for the CDP was $15,305. There were no families and 3.9% of the population living below the poverty line, including no under eighteens and 20.0% of those over 64.
