= Pennsylvania Route 77 =

State highway in Pennsylvania, US

Pennsylvania Route 77

Route information
- Maintained by PennDOT
- Length: 35.616 mi (57.318 km)

Major junctions
- West end: PA 27 in Meadville
- East end: PA 426 in Corry

Location
- Country: United States
- State: Pennsylvania
- Counties: Crawford, Erie

Highway system
- Pennsylvania State Route System; Interstate; US; State; Scenic; Legislative
← PA 76	→ I-78
← PA 276	→ PA 278

Pennsylvania Route 77 (PA 77) is a 36-mile-long (58 km) east–west state highway located in northwest Pennsylvania. The western terminus of the route is at PA 27 in Meadville. The eastern terminus is at PA 426 in Corry.

== Route description ==
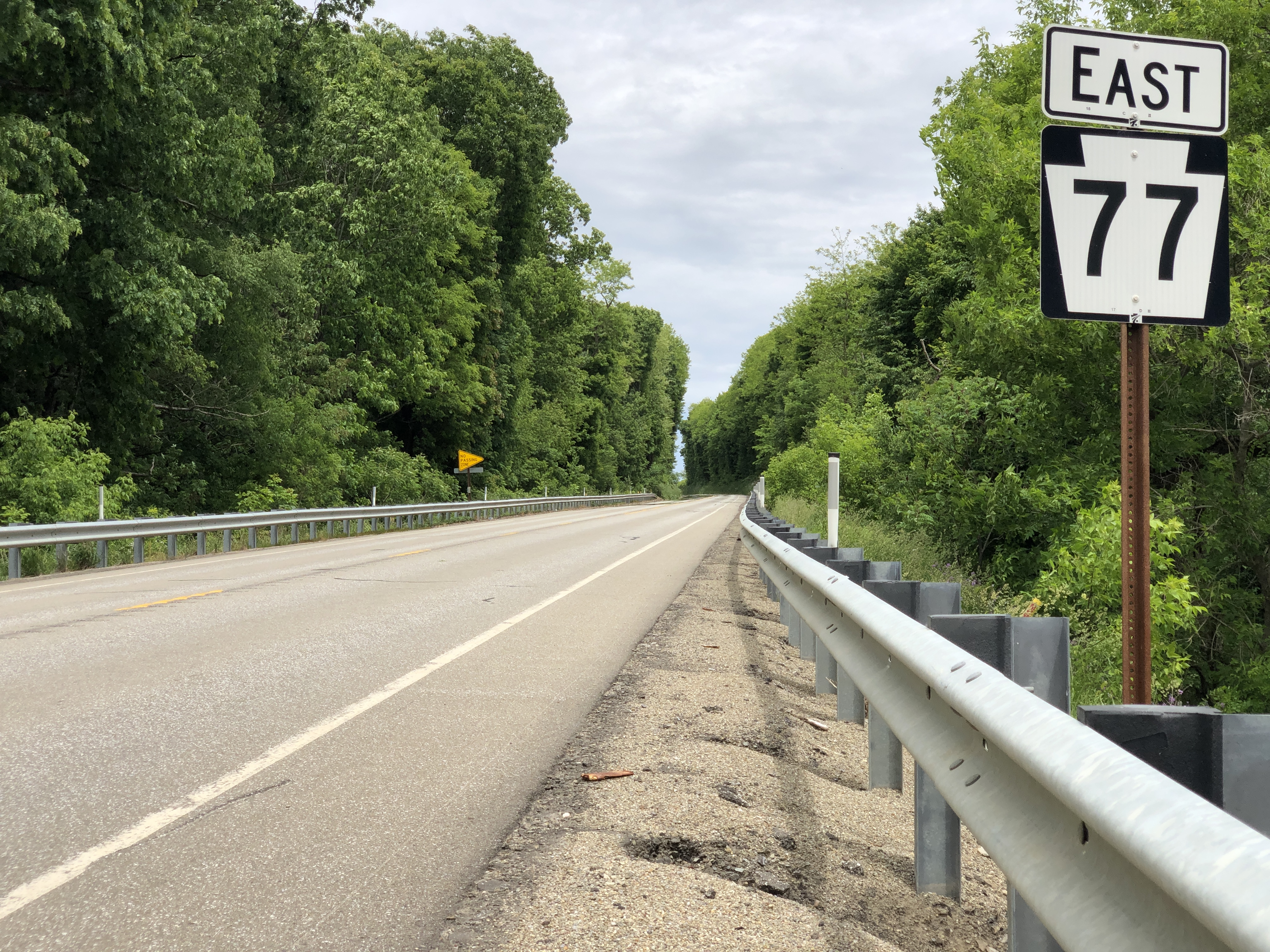
PA 77 eastbound in Athens Township

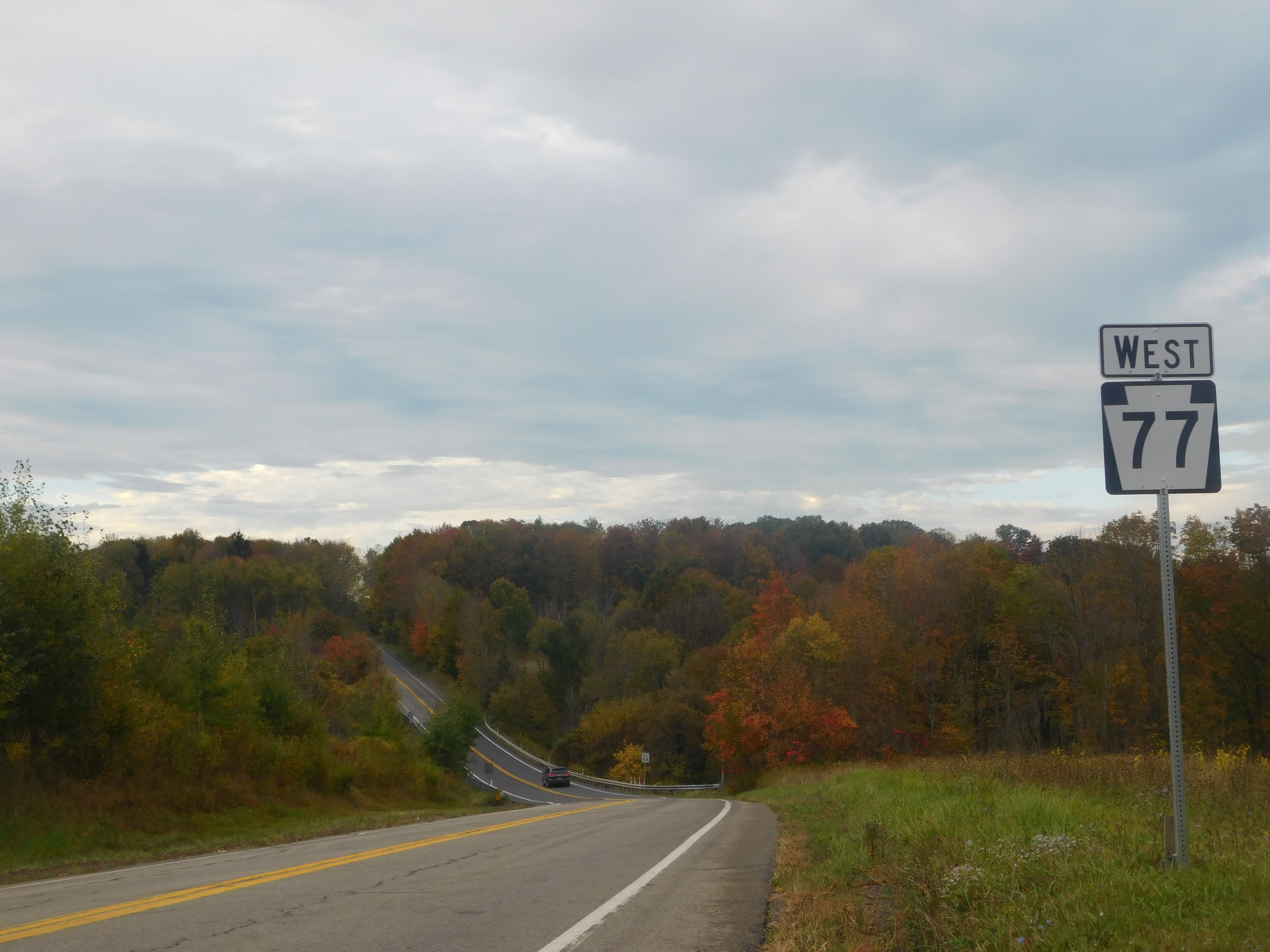
PA 77 in Concord Township

PA 77 begins at an intersection with PA 27 in the city of Meadville in Crawford County, heading northeast on two-lane undivided Hickory Street. The road passes homes, crossing into West Mead Township and becoming Blooming Valley Road. The route runs through rural residential areas before continuing into a mix of farmland and woodland with some homes, heading into East Mead Township. PA 77 becomes unnamed and runs through more rural areas, passing through a corner of Woodcock Township prior to entering the borough of Blooming Valley. Here, the road becomes State Street and passes a few homes, reaching an intersection with PA 198. The route heads back into agricultural and wooded areas with some residences as it crosses into Richmond Township. PA 77 becomes unnamed and passes through more rural areas, running through New Richmond before forming a brief concurrency with PA 408. The road heads into Athens Township and passes through Little Cooley before crossing Muddy Creek in a wooded area.

The route runs through more farms and woods with a few homes, heading into Bloomfield Township. In this area, PA 77 passes through Riceville and crosses Oil Creek before intersecting PA 8. From here, the road heads through more rural areas and continues into Sparta Township, passing through Britton Run. Farther northeast, the route comes to an intersection with PA 89 and turns north to join that route, heading through more farmland and woodland with a few residences. PA 77 splits from PA 89 by heading east on Main Street, entering the borough of Spartansburg and passing homes and businesses. The route passes south of Clear Lake and turns northeast onto Spring Street, running past more residences. The road heads back into Sparta Township and continues through areas of farm fields and woods with some homes.

PA 77 enters Concord Township in Erie County and turns north as Spartansburg Highway, running through more farmland and woodland with some residences. The road runs through wooded areas with some fields and homes, passing to the west of Corry-Lawrence Airport as it crosses into the city of Corry. Here, the route becomes Union Street and passes through woods, turning east onto West Main Street and passing through industrial and business areas with some homes as it runs a short distance to the south of a Western New York and Pennsylvania Railroad line. PA 77 ends at an intersection with PA 426 in the commercial downtown of Corry, where the road continues east as East Main Street, which is a part of PA 426.

== Major intersections ==
County	Location	mi	km	Destinations	Notes
Crawford	Meadville	0.0	0.0	PA 27 (Washington Street)	Western terminus
Crawford	Blooming Valley	5.8	9.3	PA 198 (Saegertown Road / Dickson Street) – Saegertown, Guys Mills	
Crawford	Richmond Township	11.9	19.2	PA 408 east – Townville, Titusville	West end of PA 408 concurrency
Crawford	Richmond Township	12.1	19.5	PA 408 west (Church Street) – Cambridge Springs	East end of PA 408 concurrency
Crawford	Bloomfield Township	20.8	33.5	PA 8 (Erie Street) – Union City, Titusville	
Crawford	Sparta Township	25.6	41.2	PA 89 south – Titusville	West end of PA 89 concurrency
Crawford	Sparta Township	26.8	43.1	PA 89 north (Church Run Street) – Wattsburg	East end of PA 89 concurrency
Erie	Corry	35.5	57.1	PA 426 (Center Street / Main Street)	Eastern terminus
1.000 mi = 1.609 km; 1.000 km = 0.621 mi: Concurrency terminus
