= Plum Township, Pennsylvania =

Township in Pennsylvania, US

Coordinates: 41°34′00″N 79°52′59″W

- Township
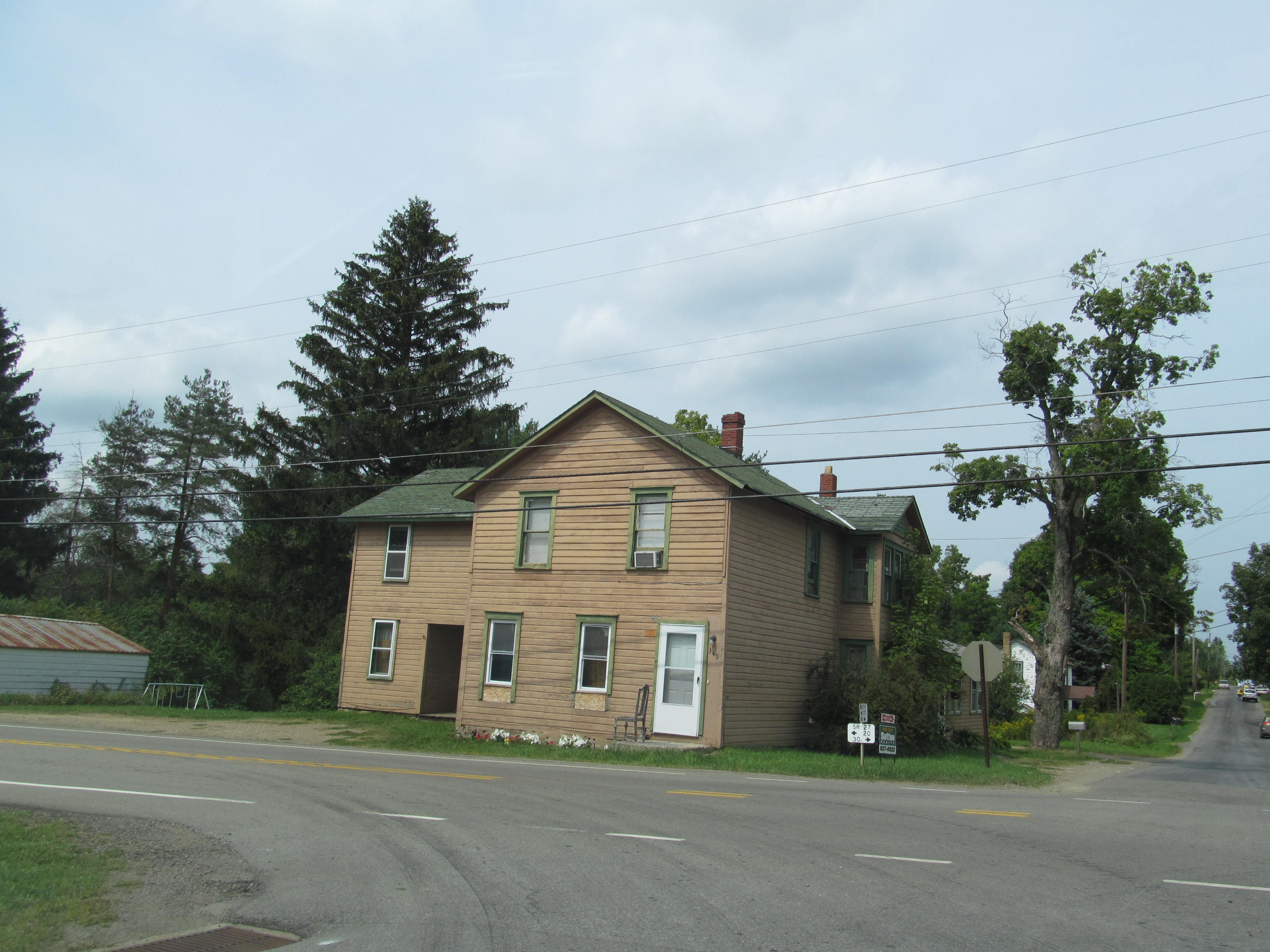
- House in Chapmanville

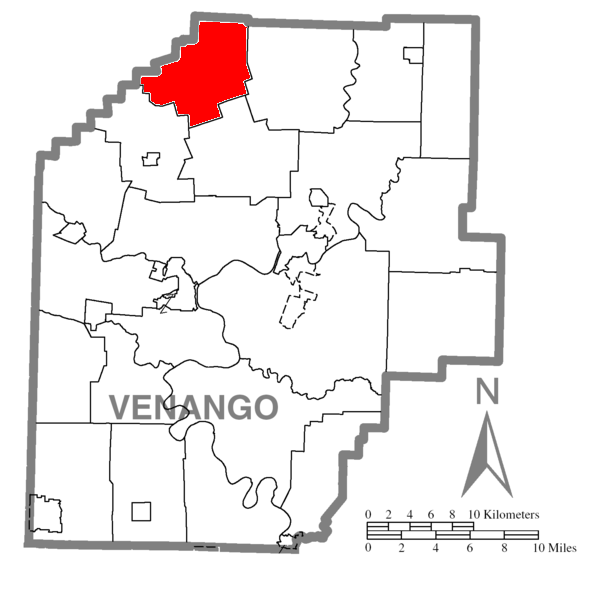
- Map of Venango County, Pennsylvania highlighting Plum Township

- Map of Venango County, Pennsylvania
- Country: United States
- State: Pennsylvania
- County: Venango
- Settled: 1800
- Incorporated: 1817

Government
  - Type: Board of Supervisors

Area
  - Total: 26.60 sq mi (68.89 km^{2})
  - Land: 26.60 sq mi (68.89 km^{2})
  - Water: 0 sq mi (0.00 km^{2})

Population (2020)
  - Total: 911 ▼
  - Estimate (2024): 888
  - Density: 37.9/sq mi (14.65/km^{2})
- Time zone: UTC-5 (Eastern (EST))
  - Summer (DST): UTC-4 (EDT)
- Area code: 814
- FIPS code: 42-121-61552

Plum Township is a township in Venango County, Pennsylvania, United States. The population was 911 at the 2020 census, a decrease from 1,056 in 2010, which was, in turn a decline from the figure of 1,060 as of the 2000 census.

== Geography ==
According to the United States Census Bureau, the township has a total area of 26.6 square miles (68.9 km^{2}), all land.

== Demographics ==
Historical population
Census	Pop.	Note	%±
2000	1,060		—
2010	1,056		−0.4%
2020	911		−13.7%
2024 (est.)	888		−2.5%
U.S. Decennial Census

As of the 2000 census, there were 1,060 people, 391 households, and 310 families residing in the township. The population density was 39.8 inhabitants per square mile (15.4/km^{2}). There were 461 housing units at an average density of 17.3/sq mi (6.7/km^{2}). The racial makeup of the township was 99.81% White, 0.09% Asian, 0.09% from other races. Hispanic or Latino of any race were 0.19% of the population.

There were 391 households, out of which 36.1% had children under the age of 18 living with them, 68.0% were Marriage|married couples living together, 7.2% had a female householder with no husband present, and 20.7% were non-families. 16.6% of all households were made up of individuals, and 8.2% had someone living alone who was 65 years of age or older. The average household size was 2.71 and the average family size was 3.05.

In the township the population was spread out, with 25.7% under the age of 18, 5.7% from 18 to 24, 29.0% from 25 to 44, 25.6% from 45 to 64, and 14.2% who were 65 years of age or older. The median age was 40 years. For every 100 females, there were 100.0 males. For every 100 females age 18 and over, there were 101.0 males.

The median income for a household in the township was $37,800, and the median income for a family was $39,511. Males had a median income of $30,500 versus $20,313 for females. The per capita income for the township was $14,578. About 6.6% of families and 8.2% of the population were below the poverty line, including 11.3% of those under age 18 and 5.9% of those age 65 or over.
