= Sugarcreek, Pennsylvania =

Borough in Pennsylvania, US

- Borough
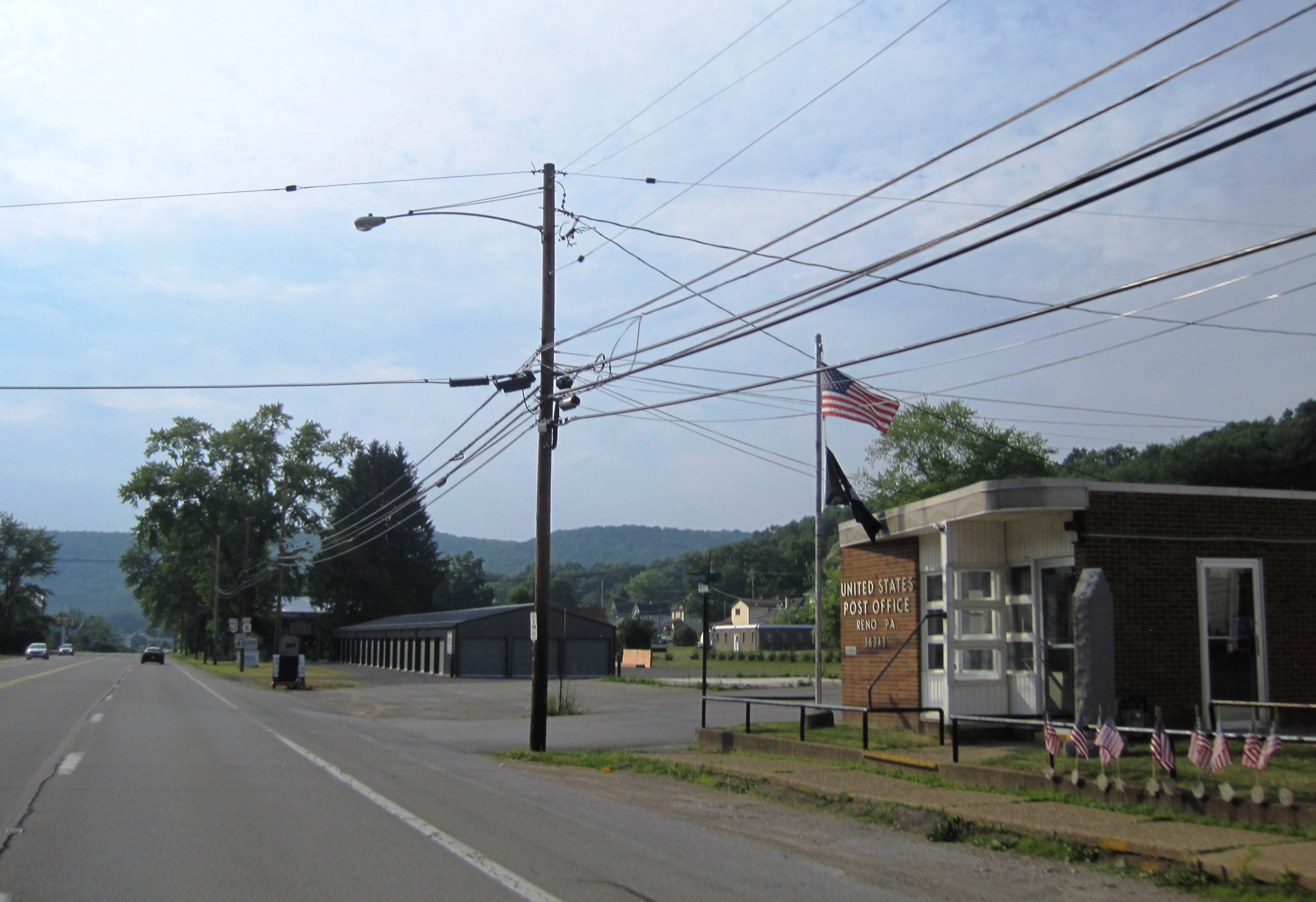
- Post office of Reno, a village within Sugarcreek Borough

- Flag Seal

- Location of Sugarcreek in Venango County, Pennsylvania.

- Location within Pennsylvania
- Coordinates: 41°25′16″N 79°49′08″W
- Country: United States
- State: Pennsylvania
- County: Venango
- Settled: 1796

Government
  - Mayor: Matthew Carlson

Area
  - Total: 38.65 sq mi (100.10 km^{2})
  - Land: 37.51 sq mi (97.16 km^{2})
  - Water: 1.14 sq mi (2.95 km^{2})

Population (2020)
  - Total: 4,775 ▼
  - Estimate (2021): 4,773
  - Density: 130.7/sq mi (50.47/km^{2})
- Time zone: UTC-5 (Eastern (EST))
  - Summer (DST): UTC-4 (EDT)
- Zip code: 16323, 16343, 16301
- Area code: 814
- FIPS code: 42-75000
- Website: https://www.sugarcreekborough.us

Sugarcreek is a borough in Venango County, Pennsylvania, United States. The population was 4,824 at the 2020 census. It is the largest borough by total area in all of Venango County.

== Geography ==
Sugarcreek is located at 41°25′16″N 79°49′8″W (41.420993, -79.818883).

According to the United States Census Bureau, the borough has a total area of 37.9 square miles (98 km^{2}), of which 37.4 square miles (97 km^{2}) is land and 0.5 square miles (1.3 km^{2}) (1.35%) is water.

== Demographics ==
Historical population
Census	Pop.	Note	%±
1970	5,944		—
1980	5,954		0.2%
1990	5,532		−7.1%
2000	5,331		−3.6%
2010	5,294		−0.7%
2020	4,775		−9.8%
2021 (est.)	4,773	▼	0.0%

=== 2020 census ===
As of the 2020 census, Sugarcreek had a population of 4,775. The median age was 47.3 years. 19.2% of residents were under the age of 18 and 25.2% of residents were 65 years of age or older. For every 100 females there were 95.0 males, and for every 100 females age 18 and over there were 92.3 males age 18 and over.

42.4% of residents lived in urban areas, while 57.6% lived in rural areas.

There were 1,964 households in Sugarcreek, of which 24.5% had children under the age of 18 living in them. Of all households, 49.7% were married-couple households, 17.4% were households with a male householder and no spouse or partner present, and 26.2% were households with a female householder and no spouse or partner present. About 28.7% of all households were made up of individuals and 15.0% had someone living alone who was 65 years of age or older.

There were 2,178 housing units, of which 9.8% were vacant. The homeowner vacancy rate was 2.0% and the rental vacancy rate was 8.3%.

Racial composition as of the 2020 census
Race	Number	Percent
White	4,524	94.7%
Black or African American	27	0.6%
American Indian and Alaska Native	13	0.3%
Asian	6	0.1%
Native Hawaiian and Other Pacific Islander	0	0.0%
Some other race	15	0.3%
Two or more races	190	4.0%
Hispanic or Latino (of any race)	28	0.6%

=== 2000 census ===
As of the census of 2000, there were 5,331 people, 2,093 households, and 1,521 families residing in the borough. The population density was 142.7 inhabitants per square mile (55.1/km^{2}). There were 2,245 housing units at an average density of 60.1 per square mile (23.2/km^{2}). The racial makeup of the borough was 98.74% White, 0.32% African American, 0.13% Native American, 0.19% Asian, 0.11% from other races, and 0.51% from two or more races. Hispanic or Latino of any race were 0.28% of the population.

There were 2,093 households, out of which 28.5% had children under the age of 18 living with them, 59.8% were married couples living together, 9.1% had a female householder with no husband present, and 27.3% were non-families. 24.0% of all households were made up of individuals, and 11.5% had someone living alone who was 65 years of age or older. The average household size was 2.44 and the average family size was 2.88.

In the borough the population was spread out, with 21.9% under the age of 18, 6.7% from 18 to 24, 26.5% from 25 to 44, 25.8% from 45 to 64, and 18.9% who were 65 years of age or older. The median age was 42 years. For every 100 females there were 90.9 males. For every 100 females age 18 and over, there were 86.9 males.

The median income for a household in the borough was $31,952, and the median income for a family was $36,926. Males had a median income of $32,875 versus $21,996 for females. The per capita income for the borough was $16,873. About 8.8% of families and 10.8% of the population were below the poverty line, including 20.1% of those under age 18 and 0.9% of those age 65 or over.
