= Troy Township, Crawford County, Pennsylvania =

Township in Pennsylvania, US

Coordinates: 41°39′00″N 79°52′59″W

- Township
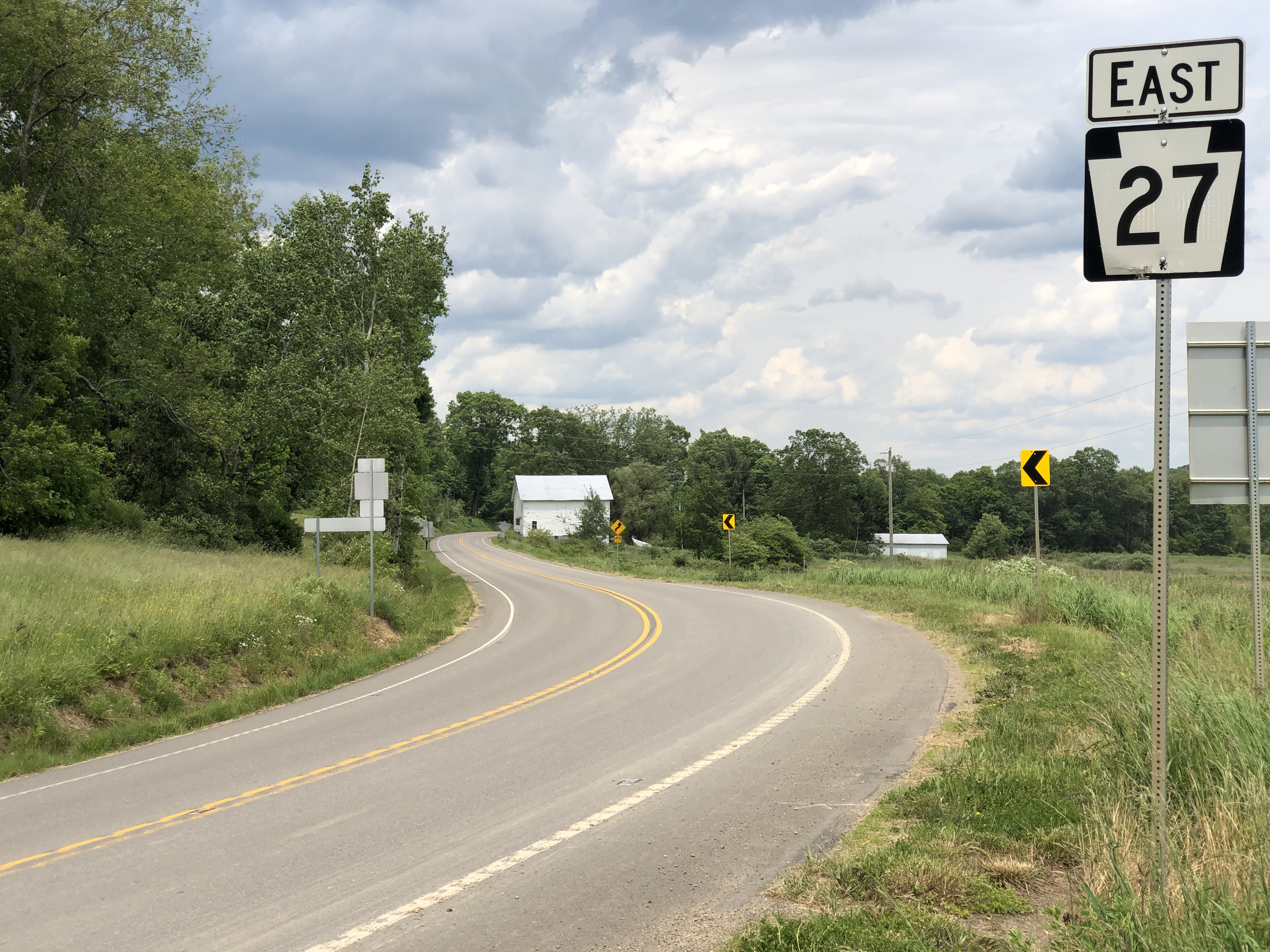
- PA 27 in Troy Township

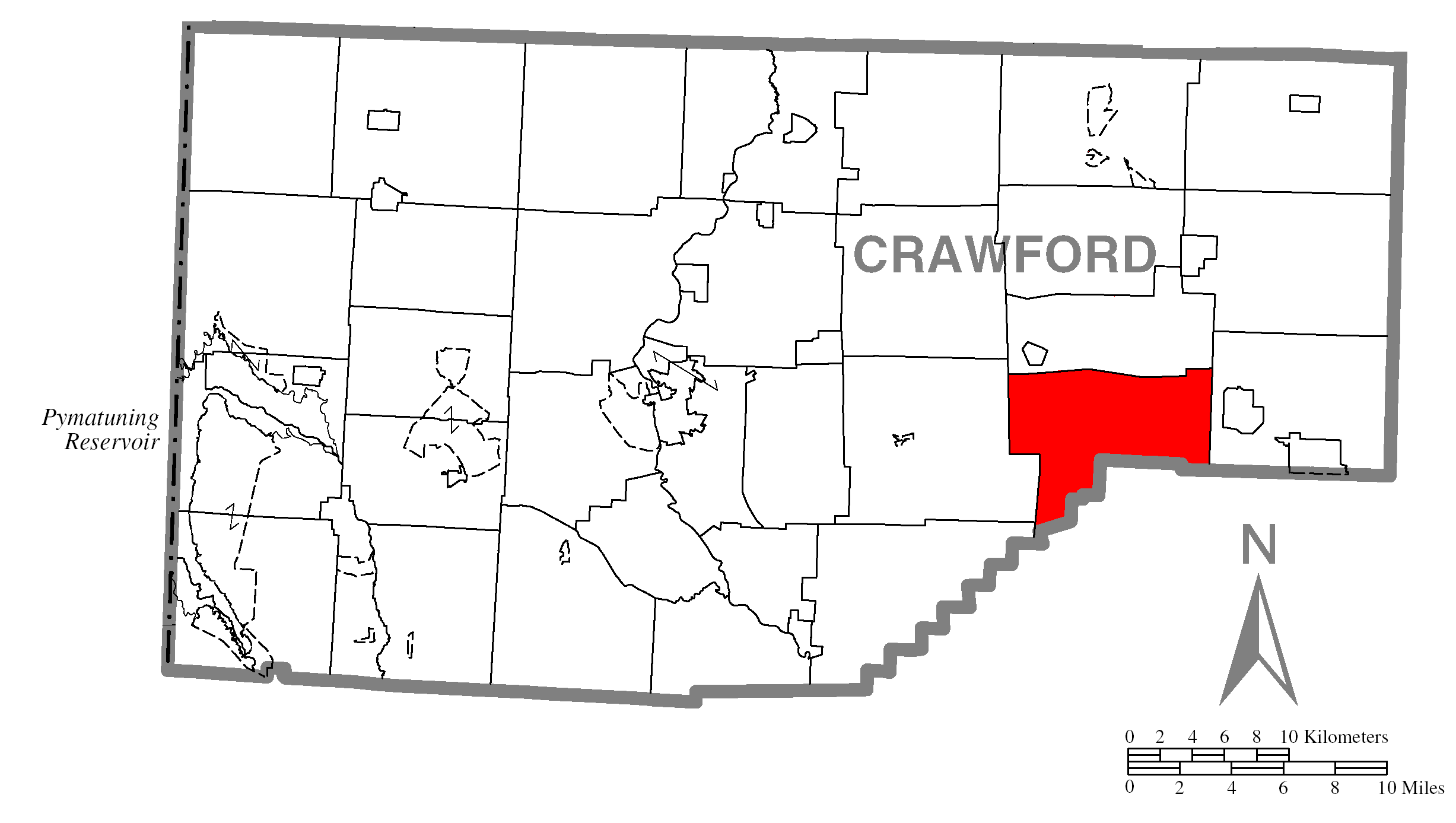
- Location of Troy Township in Crawford County

- Location of Crawford County in Pennsylvania
- Country: United States
- State: Pennsylvania
- County: Crawford County

Area
  - Total: 31.73 sq mi (82.19 km^{2})
  - Land: 31.69 sq mi (82.07 km^{2})
  - Water: 0.042 sq mi (0.11 km^{2})
- Highest elevation (Morehead Corners, Pennsylvania): 1,720 ft (520 m)
- Lowest elevation (Oil Creek): 1,238 ft (377 m)

Population (2020)
  - Total: 1,055 ▼
  - Estimate (2024): 1,043
  - Density: 37.5/sq mi (14.49/km^{2})
- Time zone: UTC-4 (EST)
  - Summer (DST): UTC-5 (EDT)
- Area code: 814
- FIPS code: 42-039-77616

Troy Township is a township in Crawford County, Pennsylvania, United States. The population was 1,055 at the 2020 census, down from 1,235 at the 2010 census.

== Geography ==
The township is in southeastern Crawford County, bordered to the south by Venango County. It includes the unincorporated hamlet of Troy Center. According to the United States Census Bureau, the township has a total area of 31.7 square miles (82.2 km^{2}), of which 31.7 square miles (82.1 km^{2}) is land and 0.04 square miles (0.1 km^{2}), or 0.14%, is water.

== Demographics ==
Historical population
Census	Pop.	Note	%±
2000	1,339		—
2010	1,235		−7.8%
2020	1,055		−14.6%
2024 (est.)	1,043		−1.1%
U.S. Decennial Census

As of the census of 2000, there were 1,339 people, 471 households, and 384 families residing in the township. The population density was 42.4 inhabitants per square mile (16.4/km^{2}). There were 559 housing units at an average density of 17.7/sq mi (6.8/km^{2}). The racial makeup of the township was 98.88% White, 0.30% African American, 0.15% Native American, 0.15% Asian, and 0.52% from two or more races. Hispanic or Latino of any race were 0.90% of the population.

There were 471 households, out of which 39.1% had children under the age of 18 living with them, 69.6% were married couples living together, 6.8% had a female householder with no husband present, and 18.3% were non-families. 15.9% of all households were made up of individuals, and 7.6% had someone living alone who was 65 years of age or older. The average household size was 2.84 and the average family size was 3.15.

In the township the population was spread out, with 29.6% under the age of 18, 6.3% from 18 to 24, 27.6% from 25 to 44, 25.7% from 45 to 64, and 10.8% who were 65 years of age or older. The median age was 36 years. For every 100 females, there were 105.4 males. For every 100 females age 18 and over, there were 98.1 males.

The median income for a household in the township was $32,216, and the median income for a family was $36,635. Males had a median income of $28,929 versus $19,712 for females. The per capita income for the township was $13,505. About 10.3% of families and 15.5% of the population were below the poverty line, including 22.8% of those under age 18 and 5.2% of those age 65 or over.
