= Rockdale Township, Pennsylvania =

Township in Pennsylvania, US

Coordinates: 41°48′00″N 80°00′59″W

Rockdale Township, Crawford County, Pennsylvania
- Township
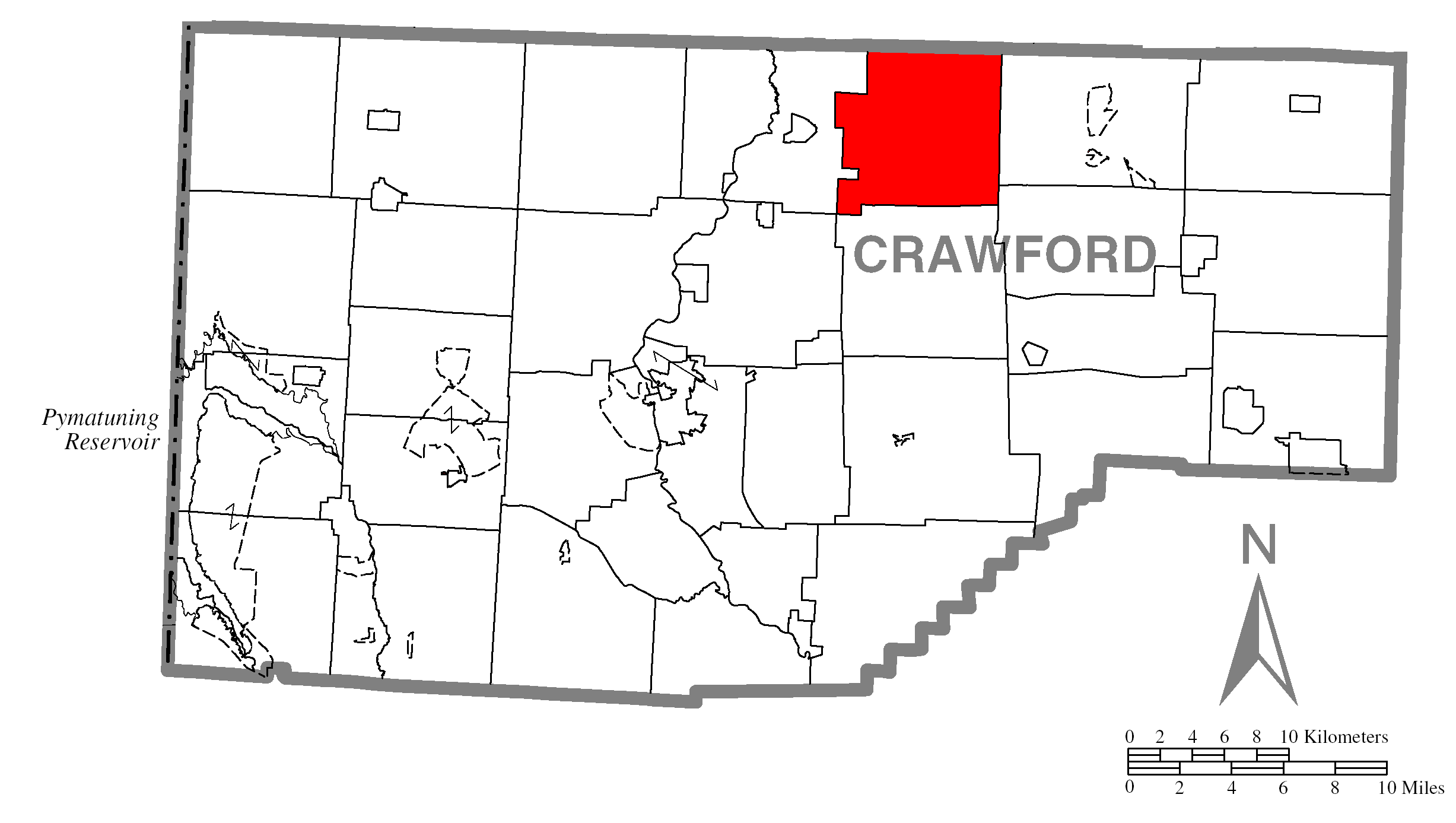
- Location of Rockdale Township in Crawford County

- Location of Crawford County in Pennsylvania
- Country: United States
- State: Pennsylvania
- County: Crawford County

Area
  - Total: 36.21 sq mi (93.79 km^{2})
  - Land: 36.03 sq mi (93.33 km^{2})
  - Water: 0.18 sq mi (0.47 km^{2})
- Highest elevation (northwest of Sturgis Corners and Brown Hill): 1,650 ft (500 m)
- Lowest elevation (French Creek): 1,130 ft (340 m)

Population (2020)
  - Total: 1,364 ▼
  - Estimate (2024): 1,361
  - Density: 40.7/sq mi (15.71/km^{2})
- Time zone: UTC-4 (EST)
  - Summer (DST): UTC-5 (EDT)
- Area code: 814
- FIPS code: 42-039-65440

Rockdale Township is a township in Crawford County, Pennsylvania, United States. The population was 1,364 at the 2020 census, down from 1,506 at the 2010 census.

== History ==
The Bridge in Rockdale Township was listed on the National Register of Historic Places in 1988.

== Geography ==
Rockdale Township is located along the northern edge of Crawford County, with Erie County to the north. According to the United States Census Bureau, the township has a total area of 36.2 square miles (93.8 km^{2}), of which 36.0 square miles (93.3 km^{2}) is land and 0.2 square miles (0.5 km^{2}), or 0.50%, is water.

=== Natural Features ===
Rockdale Township is located in the Glaciated Plateau of Northwest Pennsylvania. Rockdale Township is drained by French Creek and its tributaries, Mohawk Run, Muddy Creek, Kelly Run, and Campbell Run. Muddy Creek has one tributary, Dead Creek that is within the township. The lowest elevation, 1,130 ft (340 m), is located where French Creek flows out of the township, while the highest elevation, 1,650 ft (500 m), is located on a high point next to Gorman Road northwest of Sturgis Corners and on Brown Hill. Prominent elevations in the township include Mackey Hill -- 1,600 ft (490 m) and Brown Hill -- 1,650 ft (500 m). Spring Lake is located in the southeast corner of the township.

== Demographics ==
Historical population
Census	Pop.	Note	%±
2000	1,343		—
2010	1,506		12.1%
2020	1,364		−9.4%
2024 (est.)	1,361		−0.2%
U.S. Decennial Census

As of the census of 2000, there were 1,343 people, 454 households, and 349 families residing in the township. The population density was 37.3 inhabitants per square mile (14.4/km^{2}). There were 576 housing units at an average density of 16.0/sq mi (6.2/km^{2}). The racial makeup of the township was 98.36% White, 0.45% African American, 0.07% Native American, 0.45% Asian, and 0.67% from two or more races. Hispanic or Latino of any race were 0.15% of the population.

There were 454 households, out of which 41.6% had children under the age of 18 living with them, 64.8% were married couples living together, 6.8% had a female householder with no husband present, and 23.1% were non-families. 18.7% of all households were made up of individuals, and 7.0% had someone living alone who was 65 years of age or older. The average household size was 2.96 and the average family size was 3.39.

In the township the population was spread out, with 33.4% under the age of 18, 6.7% from 18 to 24, 28.3% from 25 to 44, 22.9% from 45 to 64, and 8.8% who were 65 years of age or older. The median age was 33 years. For every 100 females, there were 108.9 males. For every 100 females age 18 and over, there were 100.2 males.

The median income for a household in the township was $40,887, and the median income for a family was $42,067. Males had a median income of $36,989 versus $23,382 for females. The per capita income for the township was $15,071. About 12.3% of families and 16.5% of the population were below the poverty line, including 21.9% of those under age 18 and 13.9% of those age 65 or over.

== Notable person ==
- Silas U. Pinney, Wisconsin jurist and politician
