= Mill Creek (French Creek tributary) =

Stream in Pennsylvania, USA

Mill Creek Tributary to French Creek
- Location of Mill Creek mouth Mill Creek (French Creek tributary) (the United States)

Location
- Country: United States
- State: Pennsylvania
- County: Mercer; Venango

Physical characteristics
- Source: North Deer Creek divide
  - location: about 3 miles north-northeast of New Vernon, Pennsylvania
  - coordinates: 41°26′38″N 080°05′25″W
  - elevation: 1,425 ft (434 m)
- Mouth: French Creek
  - location: Utica, Pennsylvania
  - coordinates: 41°26′01″N 079°57′01″W
  - elevation: 1,024 ft (312 m)
- Length: 11.36 mi (18.28 km)
- Basin size: 15.31 square miles (39.7 km^{2})
- Discharge
  - location: French Creek
  - average: 25.09 cu ft/s (0.710 m^{3}/s) at mouth with French Creek

Basin features
- Progression: French Creek → Allegheny River → Ohio River → Mississippi River → Gulf of Mexico
- River system: Allegheny River
- Tributaries
  - left: unnamed tributaries
  - right: unnamed tributaries

Mill Creek is a 11.36 mi (18.28 km) long 2nd order tributary to French Creek in Mercer and Venango County, Pennsylvania.

== Course ==
Mill Creek rises on the North Deer Creek divide about 3 miles north-northeast of New Vernon, Pennsylvania in Mercer County. Mill Creek then flows easterly into Venango County to meet French Creek at Utica, Pennsylvania.

== Watershed ==
Mill Creek drains 15.31 square miles (39.7 km^{2}) of area, receives about 43.4 in/year of precipitation, has a topographic wetness index of 444.64, and has an average water temperature of 8.19 °C. The watershed is 58% forested.

== See also ==
- List of rivers of Pennsylvania
- List of tributaries of the Allegheny River

== Additional images ==
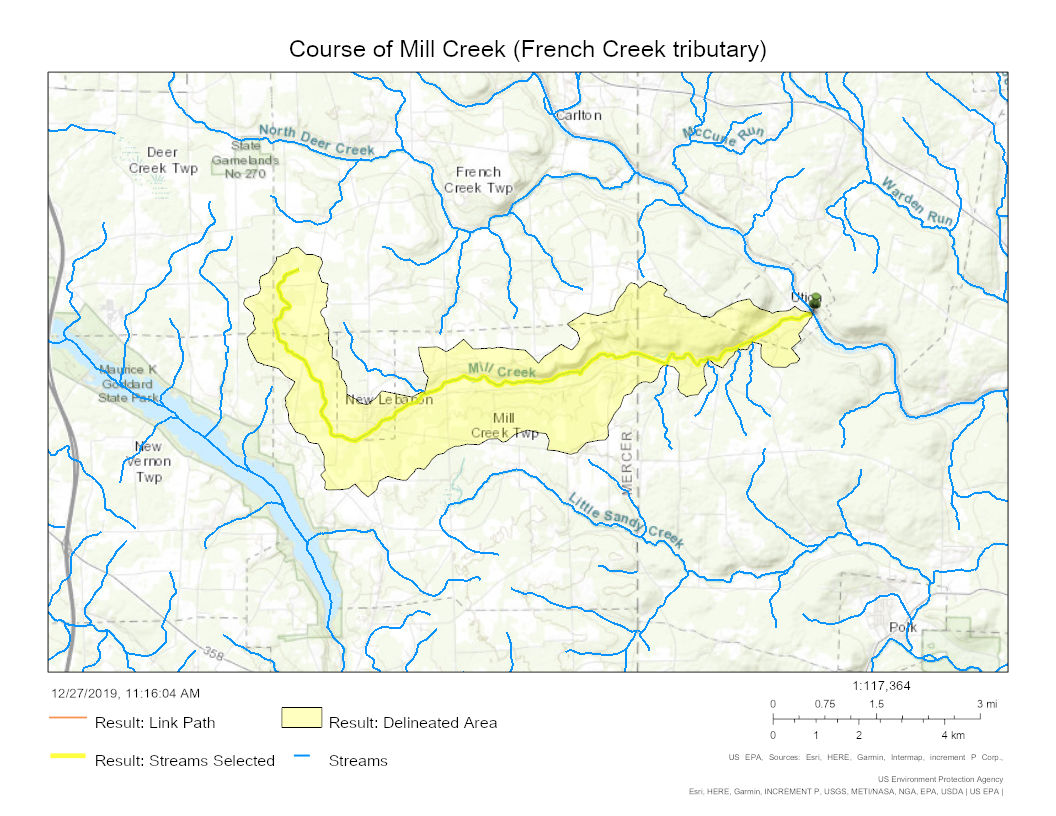
Course of Mill Creek (French Creek tributary) in Mercer and Venango Counties, Pennsylvania

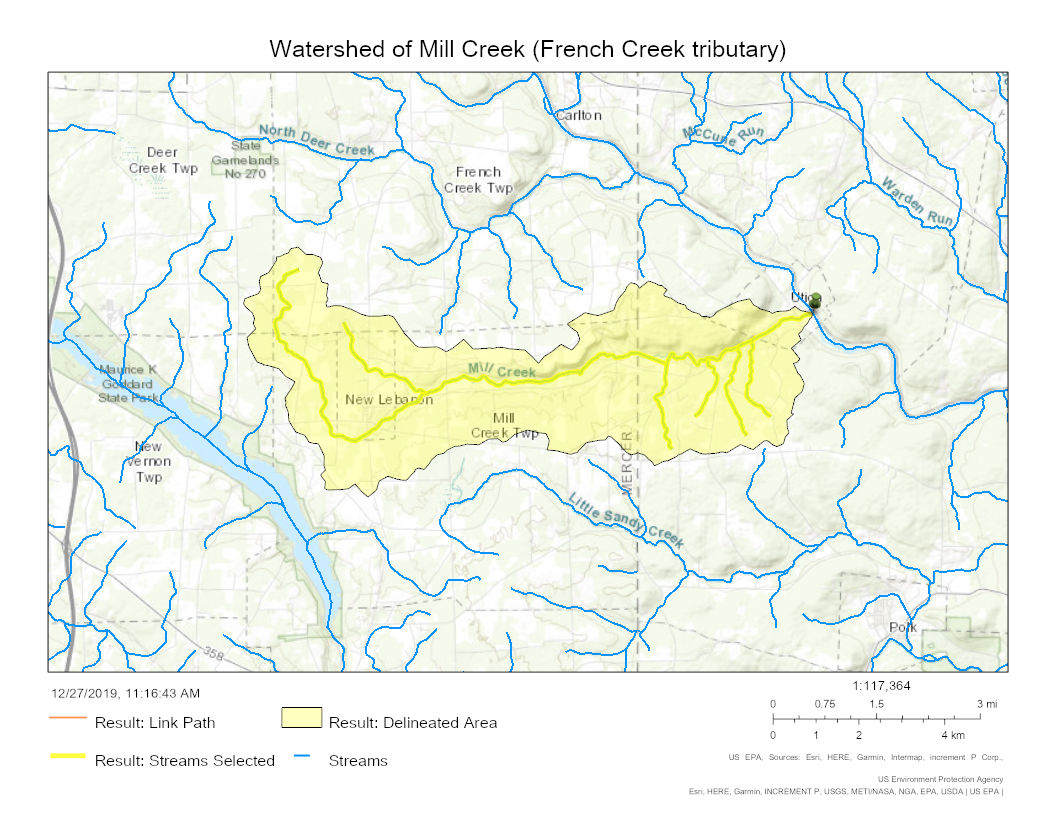
Watershed of Mill Creek (French Creek tributary) in Mercer and Venango Counties, Pennsylvania
