= McCune Run =

Stream in Pennsylvania, USA

McCune Run Tributary to French Creek
- Location of McCune Run mouth McCune Run (the United States)

Location
- Country: United States
- State: Pennsylvania
- County: Venango

Physical characteristics
- Source: Powdermill Run divide
  - location: about 1.5 miles south of Deckard, Pennsylvania
  - coordinates: 41°29′35″N 079°58′34″W
  - elevation: 1,400 ft (430 m)
- Mouth: French Creek
  - location: about 2 miles northwest of Utica, Pennsylvania
  - coordinates: 41°23′34″N 079°59′17″W
  - elevation: 1,030 ft (310 m)
- Length: 4.57 mi (7.35 km)
- Basin size: 4.42 square miles (11.4 km^{2})
- Discharge
  - location: French Creek
  - average: 7.48 cu ft/s (0.212 m^{3}/s) at mouth with French Creek

Basin features
- Progression: French Creek → Allegheny River → Ohio River → Mississippi River → Gulf of Mexico
- River system: Allegheny River
- Tributaries
  - left: unnamed tributaries
  - right: unnamed tributaries

McCune Run is a 4.57 mi (7.35 km) long 3rd order tributary to French Creek in Venango County, Pennsylvania.

== Course ==
McCune Run rises on the Powdermill Creek divide about 1.5 miles south of Deckard, Pennsylvania in Venango County. McCune Run then flows southerly through Venango County to meet French Creek about 2 miles northwest of Utica, Pennsylvania.

== Watershed ==
McCune Run drains 4.42 square miles (11.4 km^{2}) of area, receives about 43.7 in/year of precipitation, has a topographic wetness index of 409.28, and has an average water temperature of 8.25 °C. The watershed is 63% forested.

== See also ==
- List of rivers of Pennsylvania
- List of tributaries of the Allegheny River

== Additional images ==
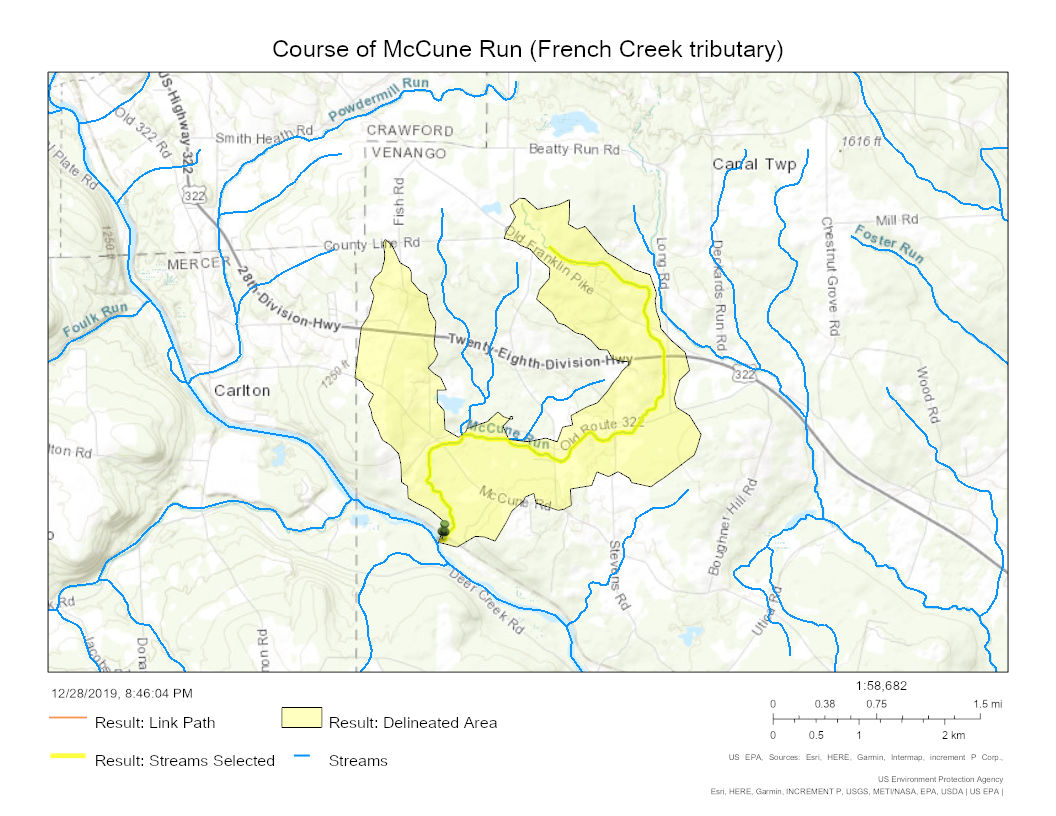
Course of McCune Run (French Creek tributary) in Venango County, Pennsylvania

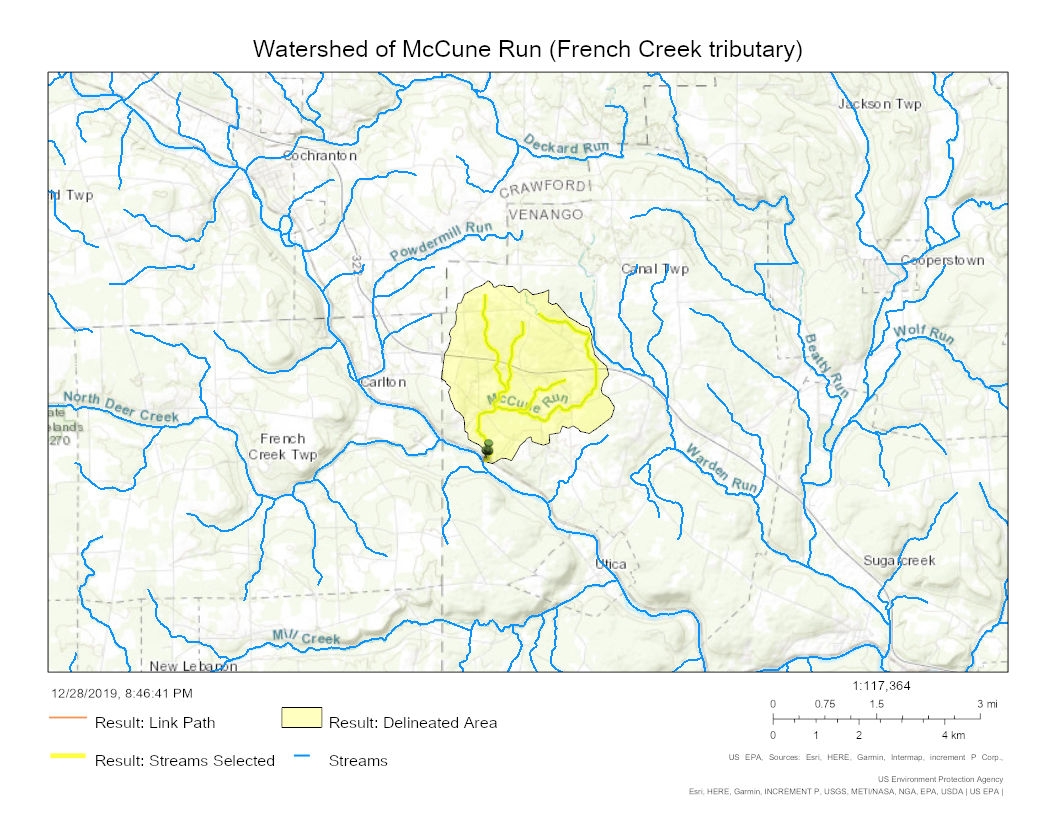
Watershed of McCune Run (French Creek tributary) in Venango County, Pennsylvania
