= Athens Township, Crawford County, Pennsylvania =

Township in Pennsylvania, US

Coordinates: 41°46′00″N 79°52′59″W

- Township
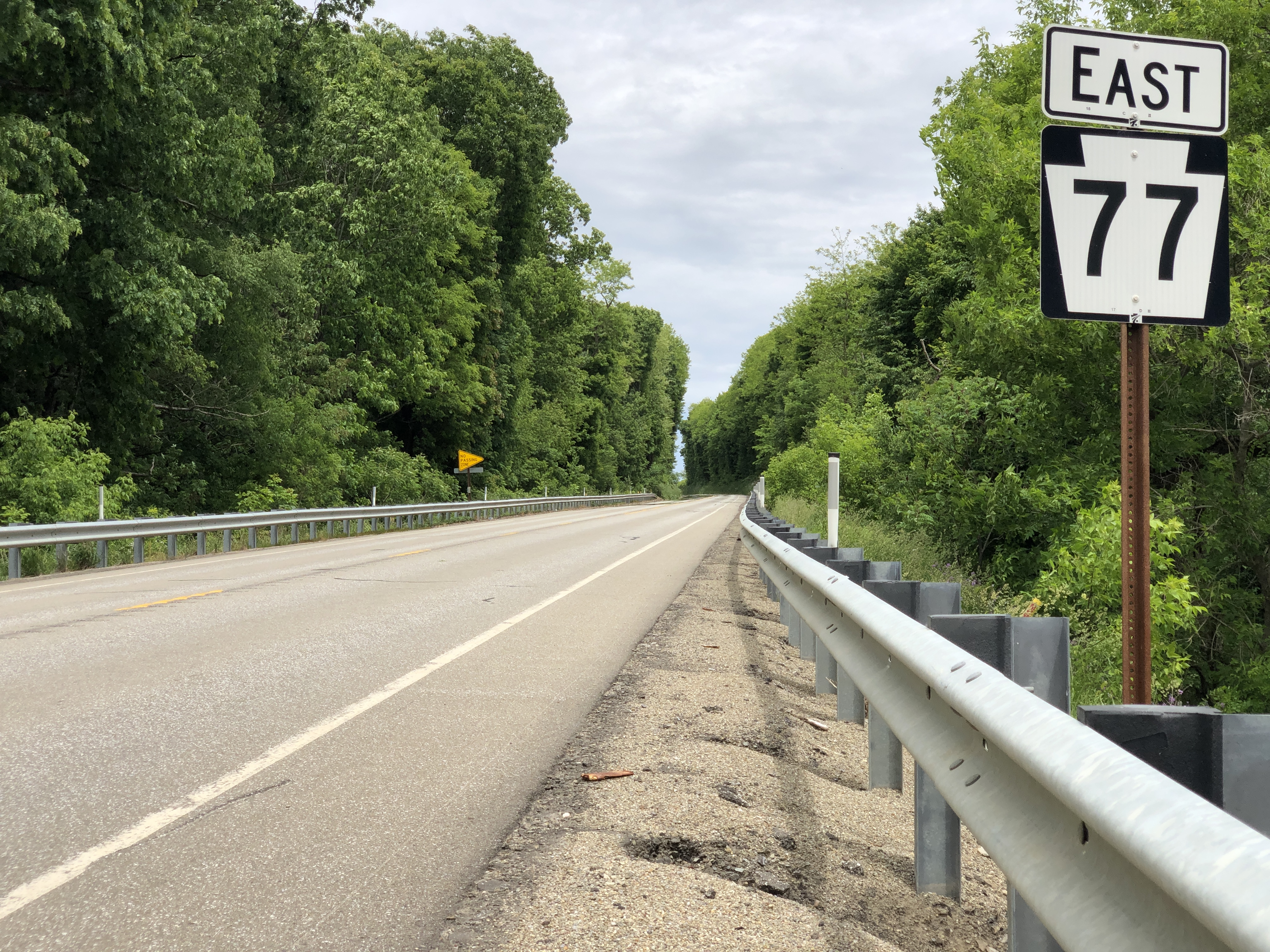
- PA 77 in Athens Township

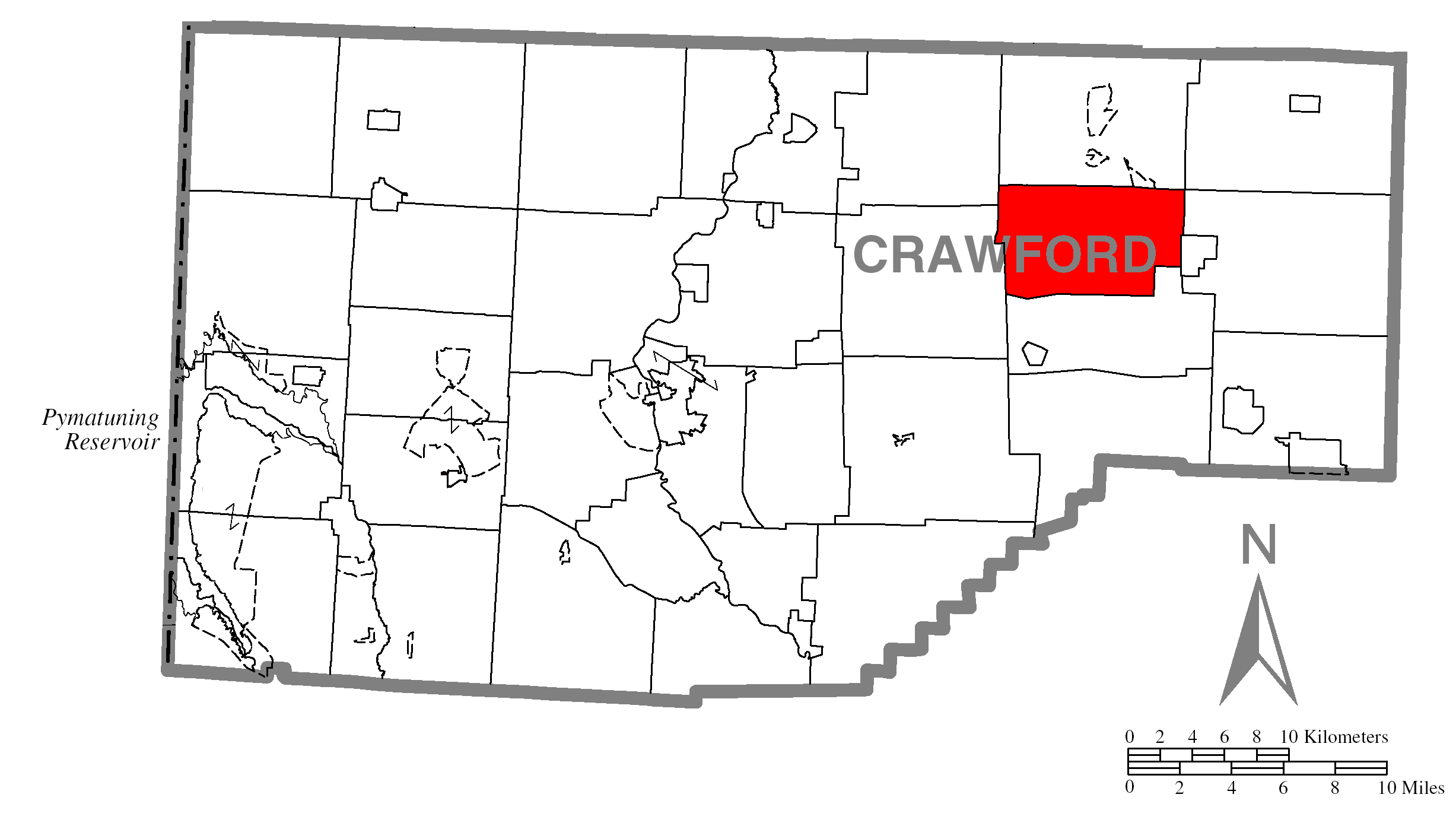
- Location of Athens Township in Crawford County

- Location of Crawford County in Pennsylvania
- Country: United States
- State: Pennsylvania
- County: Crawford County

Area
  - Total: 28.32 sq mi (73.36 km^{2})
  - Land: 28.29 sq mi (73.26 km^{2})
  - Water: 0.035 sq mi (0.09 km^{2})
- Highest elevation (East of Grange Hall road): 1,650 ft (500 m)
- Lowest elevation (Muddy Creek at Township line): 1,180 ft (360 m)

Population (2020)
  - Total: 639 ▼
  - Estimate (2024): 637
  - Density: 25.7/sq mi (9.94/km^{2})
- Time zone: UTC-4 (EST)
  - Summer (DST): UTC-5 (EDT)
- Area code: 814
- FIPS code: 42-039-03408

Athens Township is a township in Crawford County, Pennsylvania, United States. The population was 639 at the 2020 census.

== Geography ==
According to the United States Census Bureau, the township has a total area of 28.3 square miles (73.3 km^{2}), of which 28.3 square miles (73.2 km^{2}) is land and 0.04 square miles (0.1 km^{2}), or 0.12%, is water. The township is in eastern Crawford County. The unincorporated community of Little Cooley is in the western part of the township.

=== Natural Features ===
Geologic Province: Northwestern Glaciated Plateau
Lowest Elevation: 1,180 ft (360 m) where Muddy Creek flows out of the township.
Highest Elevation: 1,650 ft (500 m) east of Grange Hall Road
Major Rivers/Streams and Watersheds: Oil Creek and Muddy Creek
Minor Rivers/Streams and Watersheds: Muddy Creek tributaries: East Branch Muddy Creek, Federal Run and its tributary Little Federal Run, and Navy Run
Lakes and Waterbodies: Puckerbush and Spring Lake (both impoundments)
Biological Diversity Areas: Puckerbush Lake Tributary BDA, Muddy Creek BDA, East Branch Oil Creek BDA, Koochogey Wetlands BDA, and Muddy Creek Wetlands BDA
Landscape Conservation Area: French Creek LCA

== Demographics ==
Historical population
Census	Pop.	Note	%±
2000	775		—
2010	734		−5.3%
2020	639		−12.9%
2024 (est.)	637		−0.3%
U.S. Decennial Census

As of the census of 2000, there were 775 people, 265 households, and 209 families residing in the township. The population density was 27.4 inhabitants per square mile (10.6/km^{2}). There were 326 housing units at an average density of 11.5/sq mi (4.5/km^{2}). The racial makeup of the township was 98.32% White, 0.52% African American, 0.65% Native American, and 0.52% from two or more races. Hispanic or Latino of any race were 0.39% of the population.

There were 265 households, out of which 37.4% had children under the age of 18 living with them, 66.4% were married couples living together, 6.4% had a female householder with no husband present, and 20.8% were non-families. 17.7% of all households were made up of individuals, and 8.7% had someone living alone who was 65 years of age or older. The average household size was 2.87 and the average family size was 3.21.

In the township the population was spread out, with 28.8% under the age of 18, 6.7% from 18 to 24, 27.5% from 25 to 44, 22.7% from 45 to 64, and 14.3% who were 65 years of age or older. The median age was 36 years. For every 100 females, there were 95.7 males. For every 100 females age 18 and over, there were 98.6 males.

The median income for a household in the township was $34,000, and the median income for a family was $36,607. Males had a median income of $32,188 versus $21,250 for females. The per capita income for the township was $14,509. About 6.4% of families and 9.5% of the population were below the poverty line, including 10.7% of those under age 18 and 10.1% of those age 65 or over.
