= Athens Township, Pennsylvania =

Athens Township may refer to:

- Athens Township, Bradford County, Pennsylvania
- Athens Township, Crawford County, Pennsylvania
