= Powdermill Run =

Stream in Pennsylvania, USA

Powdermill Run Tributary to French Creek
- Location of Powdermill Run mouth Powdermill Run (the United States)

Location
- Country: United States
- State: Pennsylvania
- County: Crawford; Mercer; Venango

Physical characteristics
- Source: Warden Run divide
  - location: about 3 miles northwest of Hannasville, Pennsylvania
  - coordinates: 41°30′27″N 079°58′37″W
  - elevation: 1,405 ft (428 m)
- Mouth: French Creek
  - location: Carlton, Pennsylvania
  - coordinates: 41°28′30″N 080°01′21″W
  - elevation: 1,033 ft (315 m)
- Length: 4.32 mi (6.95 km)
- Basin size: 3.80 square miles (9.8 km^{2})
- Discharge
  - location: French Creek
  - average: 6.51 cu ft/s (0.184 m^{3}/s) at mouth with French Creek

Basin features
- Progression: French Creek → Allegheny River → Ohio River → Mississippi River → Gulf of Mexico
- River system: Allegheny River
- Tributaries
  - left: unnamed tributaries
  - right: unnamed tributaries

Powdermill Run is a 4.32 mi (6.95 km) long 2nd order tributary to French Creek in Venango County, Pennsylvania, Crawford and Mercer Counties, Pennsylvania.

== Course ==
Powdermill Run rises on the Warden Run divide about 3 miles northwest of Hannasville, Pennsylvania in Venango County. Powdermill Run then flows southwest through Crawford County into Mercer County to meet French Creek at Carlton, Pennsylvania.

== Watershed ==
Powdermill Run drains 3.80 square miles (9.8 km^{2}) of area, receives about 43.7 in/year of precipitation, has a topographic wetness index of 426.12, and has an average water temperature of 8.17 °C. The watershed is 39% forested.

== See also ==
- List of rivers of Pennsylvania
- List of tributaries of the Allegheny River

== Additional images ==
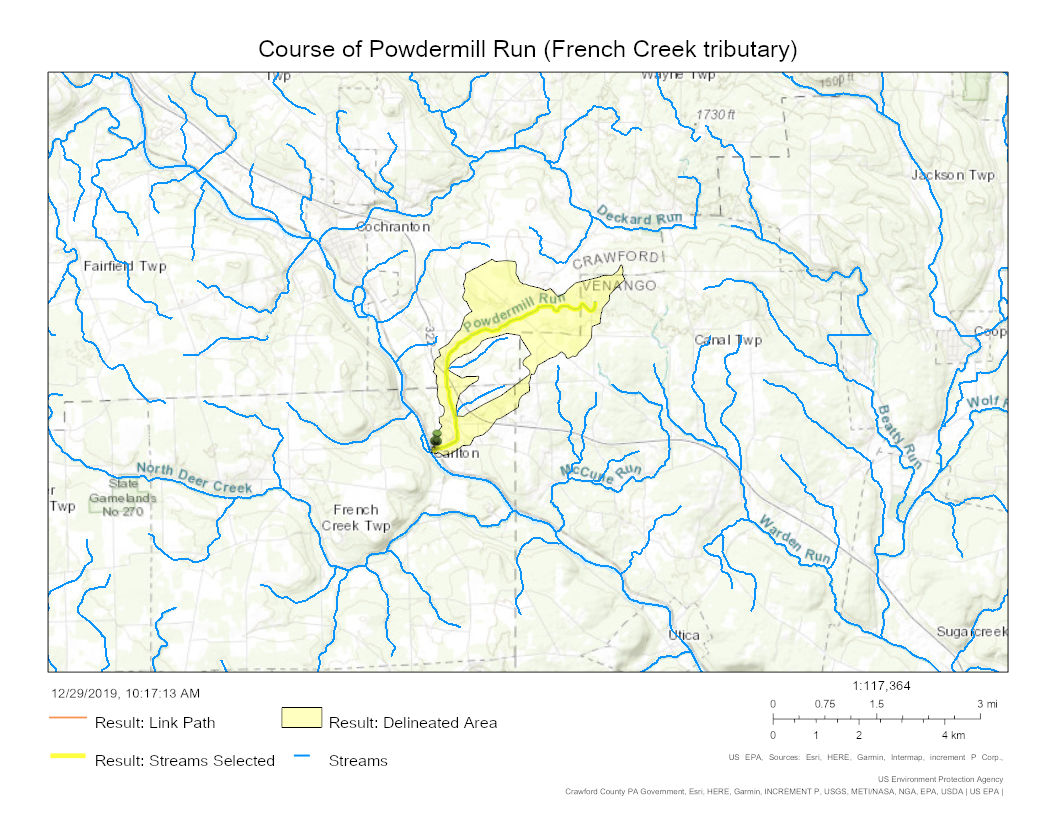
Course of Powdermill Run (French Creek tributary) in Pennsylvania

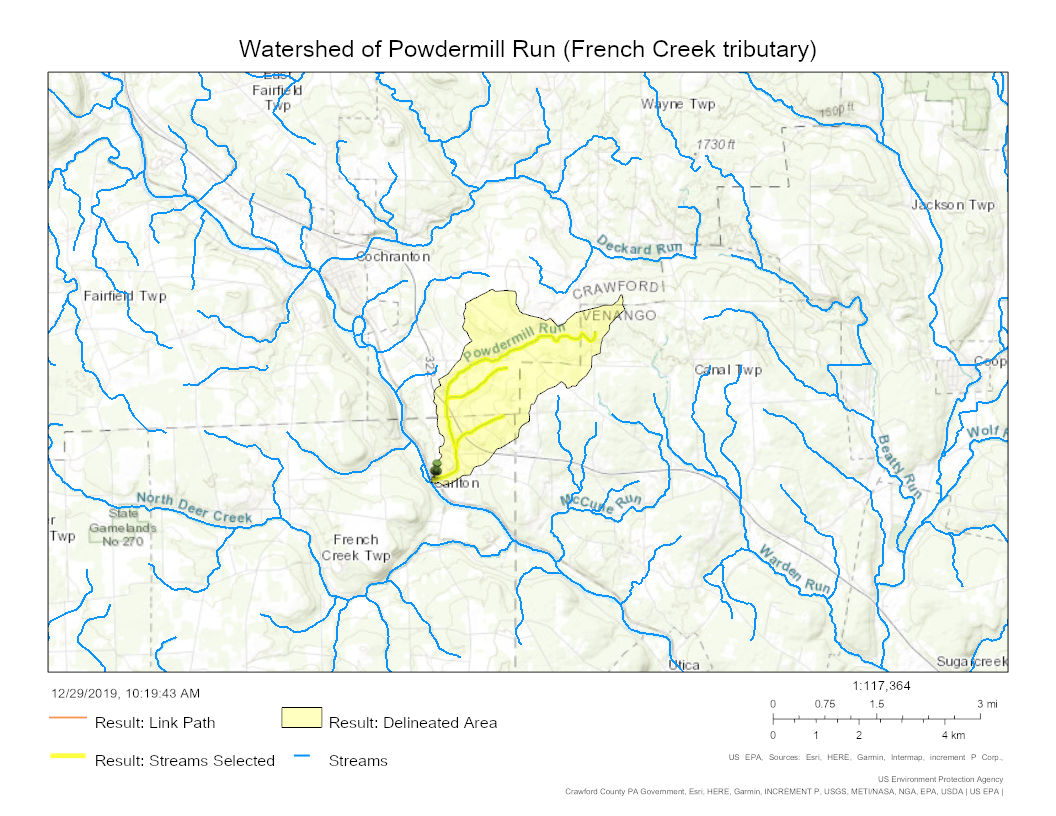
Watershed of Powdermill Run (French Creek tributary) in Pennsylvania
