= Foster Run (Sugar Creek tributary) =

Stream in Pennsylvania, USA

Foster Run Tributary to Sugar Creek
- Location of Foster Run mouth Foster Run (Sugar Creek tributary) (the United States)

Location
- Country: United States
- State: Pennsylvania
- County: Venango

Physical characteristics
- Source: Warden Run divide
  - location: about 1 mile northeast of Hannasville, Pennsylvania
  - coordinates: 41°29′27″N 079°55′57″W
  - elevation: 1,470 ft (450 m)
- Mouth: Sugar Creek
  - location: about 0.25 miles north of Wyattville, Pennsylvania
  - coordinates: 41°27′17″N 079°53′56″W
  - elevation: 1,060 ft (320 m)
- Length: 3.55 mi (5.71 km)
- Basin size: 2.13 square miles (5.5 km^{2})
- Discharge
  - location: Sugar Creek
  - average: 3.78 cu ft/s (0.107 m^{3}/s) at mouth with Sugar Creek

Basin features
- Progression: southeast
- River system: Allegheny River
- Tributaries
  - left: unnamed tributaries
  - right: unnamed tributaries

Foster Run is a 3.55 mi (5.71 km) long 1st order tributary to Sugar Creek in Venango County, Pennsylvania.

== Course ==
Foster Run rises on the Warden Run divide about 1 mile northeast of Hannasville, Pennsylvania in Venango County. Foster Run then flows southeast to meet Sugar Creek about 0.25 miles north of Wyattville, Pennsylvania in Venango County.

== Watershed ==
Foster Run drains 2.13 square miles (5.5 km^{2}) of area, receives about 44.0 in/year of precipitation, has a topographic wetness index of 410.34, and has an average water temperature of 8.27 °C. The watershed is 68% forested.

== See also ==
- List of rivers of Pennsylvania
- List of tributaries of the Allegheny River
