= Bennyhoof Creek =

Stream in Pennsylvania, USA

Bennyhoof Creek Tributary to French Creek
- Location of Bennyhoof Creek mouth Bennyhoof Creek (the United States)

Location
- Country: United States
- State: Pennsylvania
- County: Crawford
- City: Meadville

Physical characteristics
- Source: Unnamed tributary to French Creek divide
  - location: northside of Meadville, Pennsylvania
  - coordinates: 41°39′50″N 080°08′27″W
  - elevation: 1,420 ft (430 m)
- Mouth: French Creek
  - location: about 1 mile southeast of Blacks Corner, Pennsylvania
  - coordinates: 41°40′58″N 080°10′18″W
  - elevation: 1,086 ft (331 m)
- Length: 2.12 mi (3.41 km)
- Basin size: 1.25 square miles (3.2 km^{2})
- Discharge
  - location: French Creek
  - average: 2.34 cu ft/s (0.066 m^{3}/s) at mouth with French Creek

Basin features
- Progression: generally northwest
- River system: Allegheny River
- Tributaries
  - left: unnamed tributaries
  - right: unnamed tributaries
- Bridges: US 6

Bennyhoof Creek is a 2.12-mile-long (3.41 km) first-order tributary to French Creek in Crawford County. This is the only stream of this name in the United States.

== Course ==
Bennyhoof Creek rises on the northside of Meadville, Pennsylvania, and then flows northwesterly to join French Creek about 1 mile southeast of Blacks Corner, Pennsylvania.

== Watershed ==
Bennyhoof Creek drains 1.25 square miles (3.2 km^{2}) of area, receives about 44.7 in/year of precipitation, and is about 57.3% forested.

== See also ==
- List of rivers of Pennsylvania
