= Wolf Run (Sugar Creek tributary) =

Stream in Pennsylvania, USA

Wolf Run Tributary to Sugar Creek
- Location of Wolf Run mouth Wolf Run (Sugar Creek tributary) (the United States)

Location
- Country: United States
- State: Pennsylvania
- County: Venango

Physical characteristics
- Source: West Branch Two Mile Creek divide
  - location: about 1 mile south of Haslets Corners, Pennsylvania
  - coordinates: 41°28′54″N 079°49′09″W
  - elevation: 1,450 ft (440 m)
- Mouth: Sugar Creek
  - location: about 0.25 miles east of McKenzie Corners, Pennsylvania
  - coordinates: 41°28′18″N 079°52′53″W
  - elevation: 1,083 ft (330 m)
- Length: 4.43 mi (7.13 km)
- Basin size: 6.02 square miles (15.6 km^{2})
- Discharge
  - location: Sugar Creek
  - average: 10.65 cu ft/s (0.302 m^{3}/s) at mouth with Sugar Creek

Basin features
- Progression: generally west
- River system: Allegheny River
- Tributaries
  - left: unnamed tributaries
  - right: unnamed tributaries

Wolf Run, is a 4.43 mi (7.13 km) long, 2nd order tributary to Sugar Creek in Venango County, Pennsylvania.

== Course ==
Wolf Run rises on the West Branch Two Mile Run divide about 1 mile south of Haslets Corners, Pennsylvania in Venango County. Wolf Run then flows westerly to meet Sugar Creek about 0.25 miles east of McKenzie Corners, Pennsylvania in Venango County.

== Watershed ==
Wolf Run drains 6.02 square miles (15.6 km^{2}) of area, receives about 44.4 in/year of precipitation, has a topographic wetness index of 434.12, and has an average water temperature of 8.11 °C. The watershed is 78% forested.

== See also ==
- List of rivers of Pennsylvania
- List of tributaries of the Allegheny River

== Additional images ==
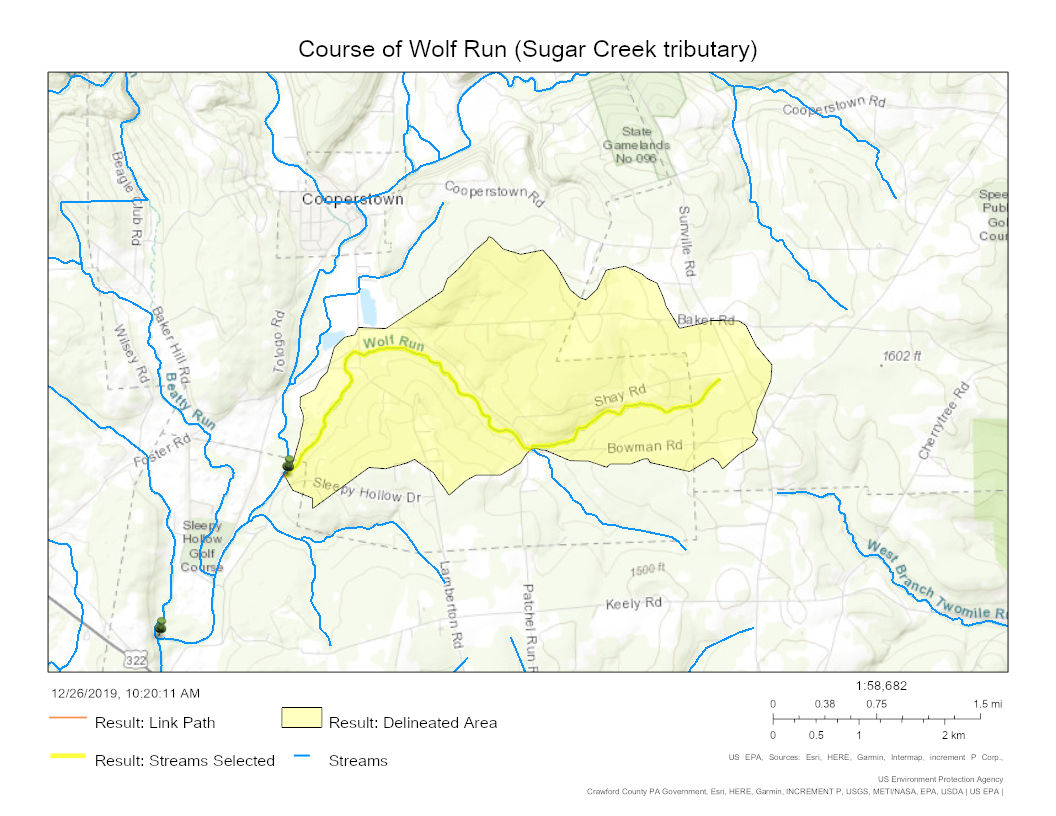
Course of Wolf Run (Sugar Creek tributary)

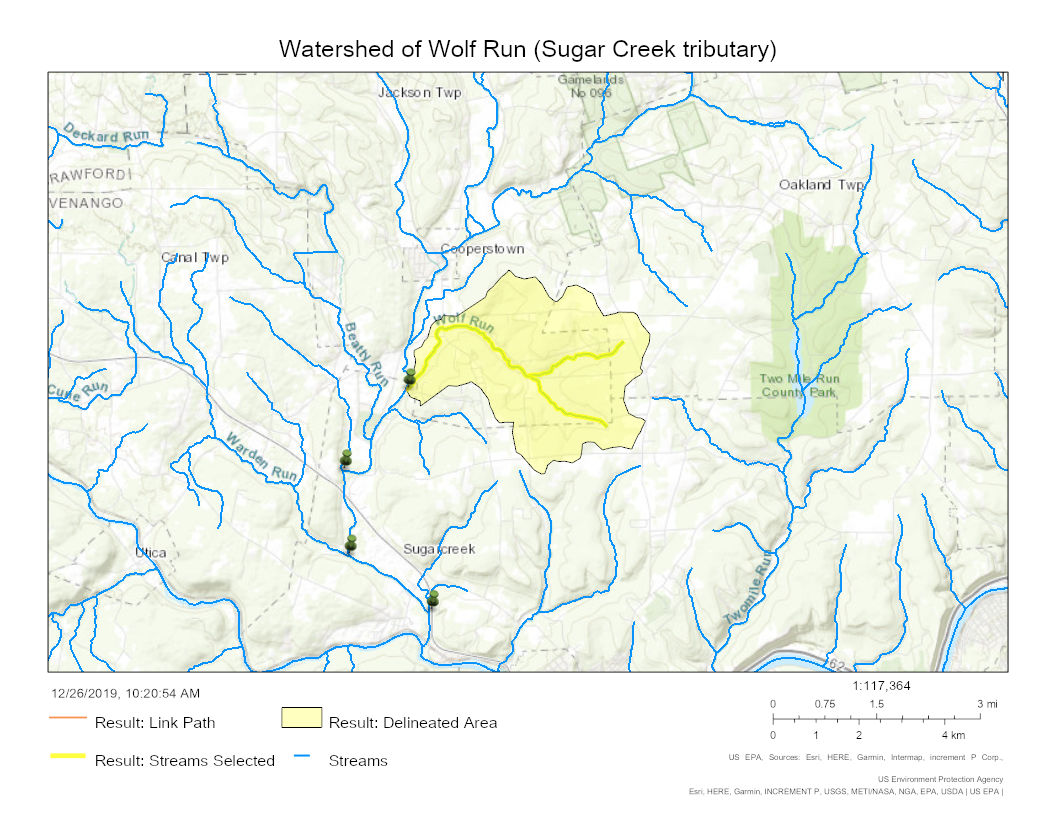
Watershed of Wolf Run (Sugar Creek tributary)
