= Dead Creek (Muddy Creek tributary) =

Stream in Pennsylvania, U.S.

Dead Creek Tributary to Muddy Creek
- Location of Dead Creek mouth Dead Creek (Muddy Creek tributary) (the United States)

Location
- Country: United States
- State: Pennsylvania
- County: Crawford

Physical characteristics
- Source: Mackey Run divide
  - location: Eaton Corners, Pennsylvania
  - coordinates: 41°45′26″N 079°56′06″W
  - elevation: 1,168 ft (356 m)
- Mouth: Muddy Creek
  - location: about 1 mile southwest of Ferris Corners, Pennsylvania
  - coordinates: 41°47′10″N 079°58′47″W
  - elevation: 1,139 ft (347 m)
- Length: 3.52 mi (5.66 km)
- Basin size: 5.15 square miles (13.3 km^{2})
- Discharge
  - location: Muddy Creek
  - average: 9.30 cu ft/s (0.263 m^{3}/s) at mouth with Muddy Creek

Basin features
- Progression: northwest
- River system: Allegheny River
- Tributaries
  - left: unnamed tributaries
  - right: unnamed tributaries
- Bridges: Teepleville Road, Swamp Road

Dead Creek is a 3.52 mi (5.66 km) long 3rd order tributary to Muddy Creek in Crawford County, Pennsylvania.

== Course ==
Dead Creek rises in Eaton Corners, Pennsylvania, and then flows northwest to join Muddy Creek about 1 mile south of Ferris Corners.

== Watershed ==
Dead Creek drains 5.15 square miles (13.3 km^{2}) of area, receives about 44.8 in/year of precipitation, has a wetness index of 503.78, and is about 44% forested.

== See also ==
- List of rivers of Pennsylvania
