= Gravel Run (French Creek tributary) =

Stream in Pennsylvania, USA

Gravel Run Tributary to French Creek
- Location of Gravel Run mouth Gravel Run (French Creek tributary) (the United States)

Location
- Country: United States
- State: Pennsylvania
- County: Crawford

Physical characteristics
- Source: Woodcock Creek divide
  - location: about 1.5 miles west of Pinney Corners, Pennsylvania
  - coordinates: 41°42′49″N 080°02′50″W
  - elevation: 1,460 ft (450 m)
- Mouth: French Creek
  - location: about 1.5 miles west of Woodcock, Pennsylvania
  - coordinates: 41°45′27″N 080°06′42″W
  - elevation: 1,128 ft (344 m)
- Length: 5.48 mi (8.82 km)
- Basin size: 11.73 square miles (30.4 km^{2})
- Discharge
  - location: French Creek
  - average: 20.88 cu ft/s (0.591 m^{3}/s) at mouth with French Creek

Basin features
- Progression: French Creek → Allegheny River → Ohio River → Mississippi River → Gulf of Mexico
- River system: Allegheny River
- Tributaries
  - left: unnamed tributaries
  - right: unnamed tributaries
- Bridges: Stoltz Road, Dibble Hill Road, Leimbach Road, Huson Road, Amy Road, PA 86, Bockman Hollow Road

Gravel Run is a 5.48 mi (8.82 km) long 2nd order tributary to French Creek in Crawford County, Pennsylvania.

== Variant names ==
According to the Geographic Names Information System, it has also been known historically as:

- Gravel Creek

== Course ==
Gravel Run rises about 1.5 miles west of Pinney Corners, Pennsylvania, and then flows generally west-northwest to join French Creek about 1.5 miles west of Woodcock, Pennsylvania.

== Watershed ==
Gravel Run drains 11.73 square miles (30.4 km^{2}) of area, receives about 44.9 in/year of precipitation, has a wetness index of 436.22, and is about 53% forested.

== See also ==
- List of rivers of Pennsylvania
