= Mackey Run (Muddy Creek tributary) =

Stream in Pennsylvania, USA

Mackey Run Tributary to Muddy Creek
- Location of Mackey Run mouth Mackey Run (Muddy Creek tributary) (the United States)

Location
- Country: United States
- State: Pennsylvania
- County: Crawford

Physical characteristics
- Source: Gravel Run divide
  - location: about 3 miles east of Woodcock, Pennsylvania
  - coordinates: 41°44′54″N 080°00′53″W
  - elevation: 1,568 ft (478 m)
- Mouth: Muddy Creek
  - location: about 0.5 miles south of Eaton Corners, Pennsylvania
  - coordinates: 41°45′17″N 079°55′33″W
  - elevation: 1,168 ft (356 m)
- Length: 5.97 mi (9.61 km)
- Basin size: 13.07 square miles (33.9 km^{2})
- Discharge
  - location: Muddy Creek
  - average: 23.72 cu ft/s (0.672 m^{3}/s) at mouth with Muddy Creek

Basin features
- Progression: east-northeast
- River system: Allegheny River
- Tributaries
  - left: unnamed tributaries
  - right: unnamed tributaries
- Bridges: Greytown Hills Road, White Hill Road, N Richmond Road, New Richmond Road, PA 408

Mackey Run is a 5.97 mi (9.61 km) long 3rd order tributary to Muddy Creek in Crawford County, Pennsylvania.

== Course ==
Mackey Run rises about 3 miles east of Woodcock, Pennsylvania, and then flows east-northeast to join Muddy Creek about 0.5 miles south of Eaton Corners.

== Watershed ==
Mackey Run drains 13.07 square miles (33.9 km^{2}) of area, receives about 45.0 in/year of precipitation, has a wetness index of 457.36, and is about 69% forested.

== See also ==
- List of rivers of Pennsylvania
