= East Branch Sugar Creek =

Stream in Pennsylvania, USA

East Branch Sugar Creek Tributary to Sugar Creek
- Location of East Branch Sugar Creek mouth East Branch Sugar Creek (the United States)

Location
- Country: United States
- State: Pennsylvania
- County: Venango

Physical characteristics
- Source: Twomile Run divide
  - location: about 0.25 miles east of Dempseytown, Pennsylvania
  - coordinates: 41°31′49″N 079°45′04″W
  - elevation: 1,500 ft (460 m)
- Mouth: Sugar Creek
  - location: Cooperstown, Pennsylvania
  - coordinates: 41°30′13″N 079°51′46″W
  - elevation: 1,132 ft (345 m)
- Length: 7.21 mi (11.60 km)
- Basin size: 49.17 square miles (127.3 km^{2})
- Discharge
  - location: Sugar Creek
  - average: 88.35 cu ft/s (2.502 m^{3}/s) at mouth with Sugar Creek

Basin features
- Progression: generally west
- River system: Allegheny River
- Tributaries
  - left: unnamed tributaries
  - right: Little Sugar Creek

East Branch Sugar Creek is a 7.21 mi (11.60 km) long 3rd order tributary to Sugar Creek in Venango County, Pennsylvania.

== Course ==
East Branch Sugar Creek rises on the Twomile Run divide about 0.25 miles east of Dempseytown in Venango County, Pennsylvania. East Branch Sugar Creek then flows westerly to meet Sugar Creek at Cooperstown, Pennsylvania.

== Watershed ==
East Branch Sugar Creek drains 49.17 square miles (127.3 km^{2}) of area, receives about 44.8 in/year of precipitation, has a topographic wetness index of 451.28, and has an average water temperature of 7.81 °C. The watershed is 66% forested.

== See also ==
- List of rivers of Pennsylvania
- List of tributaries of the Allegheny River

== Additional images ==
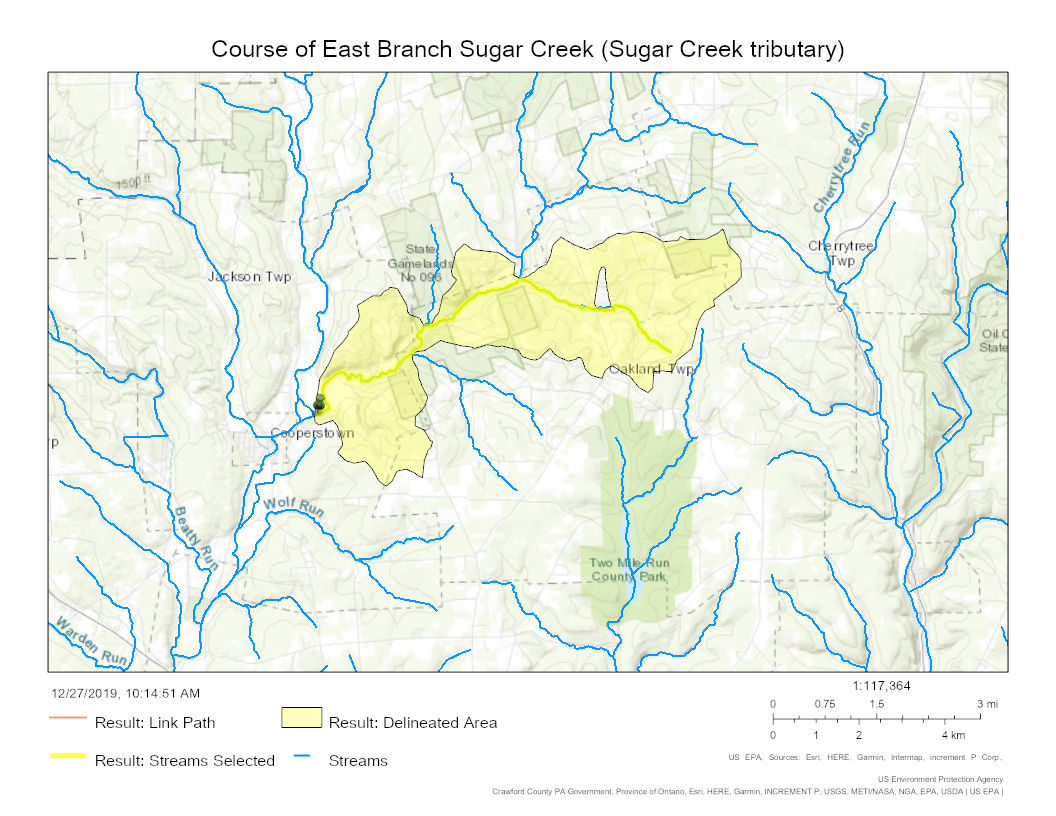
Course of East Branch Sugar Creek (Sugar Creek tributary) in Venango County, Pennsylvania

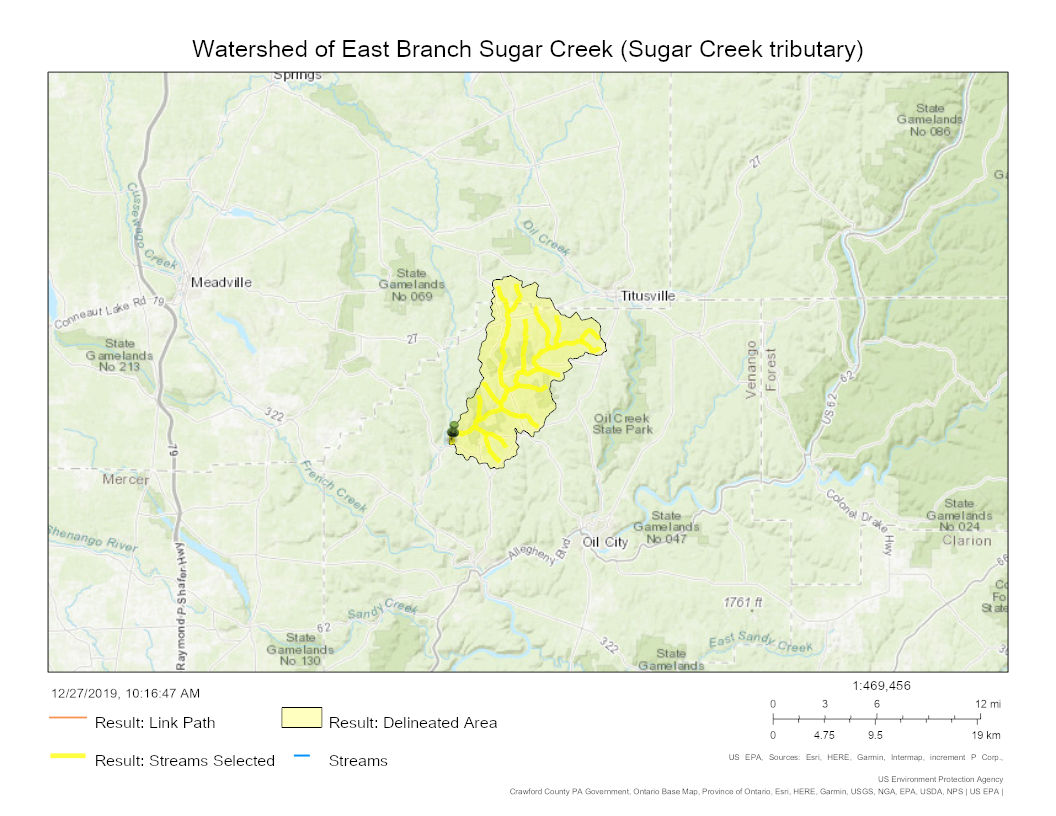
Watershed of East Branch Sugar Creek (Sugar Creek tributary) in Venango County, Pennsylvania
