= North Deer Creek (French Creek tributary) =

Stream in Pennsylvania, USA

North Deer Creek Tributary to French Creek
- Location of North Deer Creek mouth North Deer Creek (French Creek tributary) (the United States)

Location
- Country: United States
- State: Pennsylvania
- County: Crawford; Mercer

Physical characteristics
- Source: Conneaut Outlet divide
  - location: about 1 mile northeast of Sunol, Pennsylvania
  - coordinates: 41°27′48″N 080°00′01″W
  - elevation: 1,410 ft (430 m)
- Mouth: French Creek
  - location: about 1 mile southeast of Carlton, Pennsylvania
  - coordinates: 41°27′48″N 080°07′31″W
  - elevation: 1,030 ft (310 m)
- Length: 9.24 mi (14.87 km)
- Basin size: 18.70 square miles (48.4 km^{2})
- Discharge
  - location: French Creek
  - average: 30.36 cu ft/s (0.860 m^{3}/s) at mouth with French Creek

Basin features
- Progression: French Creek → Allegheny River → Ohio River → Mississippi River → Gulf of Mexico
- River system: Allegheny River
- Tributaries
  - left: unnamed tributaries
  - right: unnamed tributaries

North Deer Creek is a 9.24 mi (14.87 km) long 2nd order tributary to French Creek in Mercer County, Pennsylvania.

== Course ==
North Deer Creek rises on the Conneaut Outlet divide about 1 mile northeast of Sunol, Pennsylvania in Mercer County. North Deer Creek then flows easterly to meet French Creek about 1 mile southeast of Carlton, Pennsylvania.

== Watershed ==
North Deer Creek drains 18.70 square miles (48.4 km^{2}) of area, receives about 43.4 in/year of precipitation, has a topographic wetness index of 456.90, and has an average water temperature of 8.23 °C. The watershed is 54% forested.

== See also ==
- List of rivers of Pennsylvania
- List of tributaries of the Allegheny River

== Additional images ==
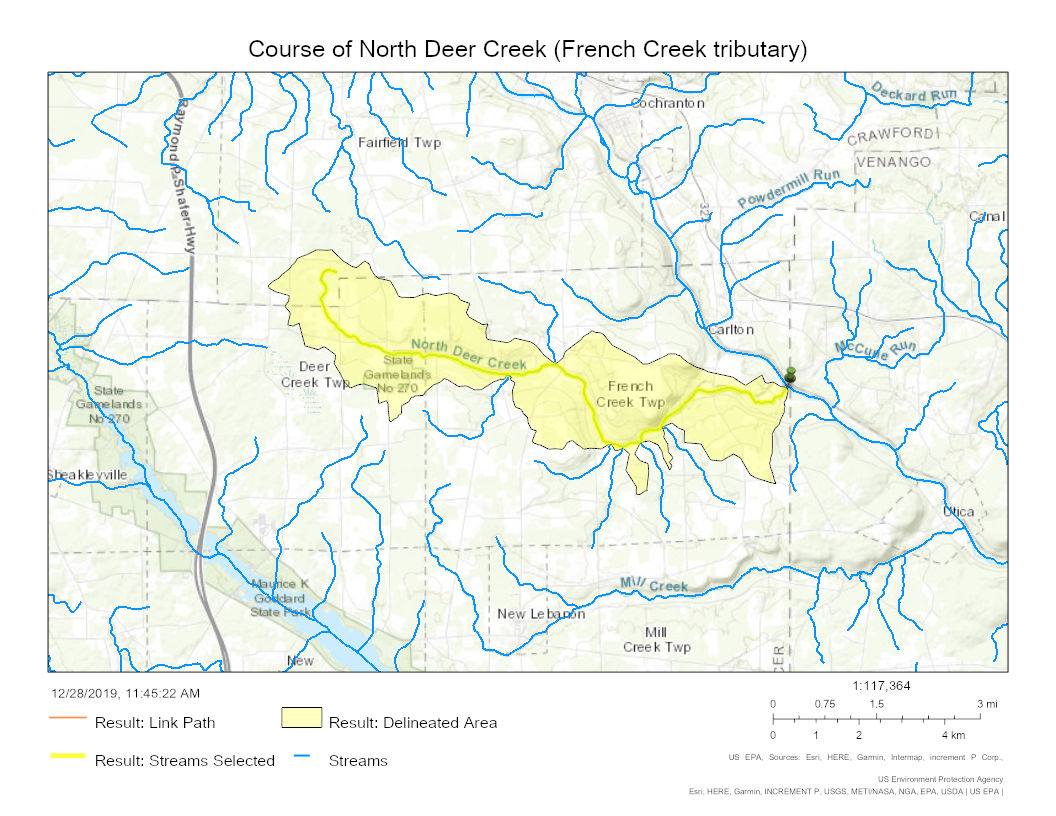
Course of North Deer Creek (French Creek tributary) in Mercer County, Pennsylvania

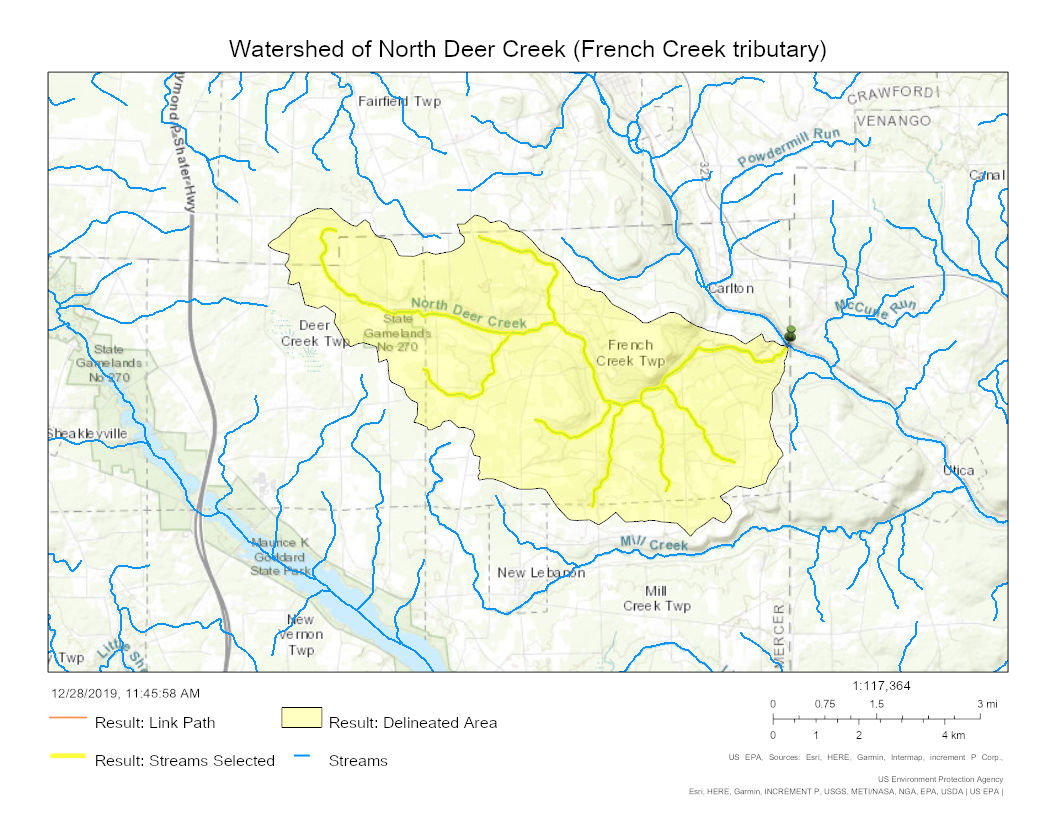
Watershed of North Deer Creek (French Creek tributary) in Mercer County, Pennsylvania
