= Warden Run (Sugar Creek tributary) =

Stream in Pennsylvania, USA

Warden Run Tributary to Sugar Creek
- Location of Warden Run mouth Warden Run (Sugar Creek tributary) (the United States)

Location
- Country: United States
- State: Pennsylvania
- County: Venango

Physical characteristics
- Source: Beatty Run divide
  - location: about 1 mile north of Hannasville, Pennsylvania
  - coordinates: 41°30′24″N 079°57′25″W
  - elevation: 1,600 ft (490 m)
- Mouth: Sugar Creek
  - location: about 1 mile northwest of Sugar Creek, Pennsylvania
  - coordinates: 41°25′31″N 079°52′31″W
  - elevation: 1,040 ft (320 m)
- Length: 6.13 mi (9.87 km)
- Basin size: 11.15 square miles (28.9 km^{2})
- Discharge
  - location: Sugar Creek
  - average: 18.99 cu ft/s (0.538 m^{3}/s) at mouth with Sugar Creek

Basin features
- Progression: southeast
- River system: Allegheny River
- Tributaries
  - left: unnamed tributaries
  - right: unnamed tributaries

Warden Run is a 6.13 mi (9.87 km) long 3rd order tributary to Sugar Creek in Venango County, Pennsylvania.

== Course ==
Warden Run rises on the Beatty Run divide about 1.5 miles north of Hannasville, Pennsylvania in Venango County. Warden Run then flows southeast to meet Sugar Creek about 1 mile northwest of Sugar Creek, Pennsylvania in Venango County.

== Watershed ==
Warden Run drains 11.18 square miles (29.0 km^{2}) of area, receives about 43.9 in/year of precipitation, has a topographic wetness index of 418.24, and has an average water temperature of 8.14 °C. The watershed is 63% forested.

== See also ==
- List of rivers of Pennsylvania
- List of tributaries of the Allegheny River

== Additional Maps ==
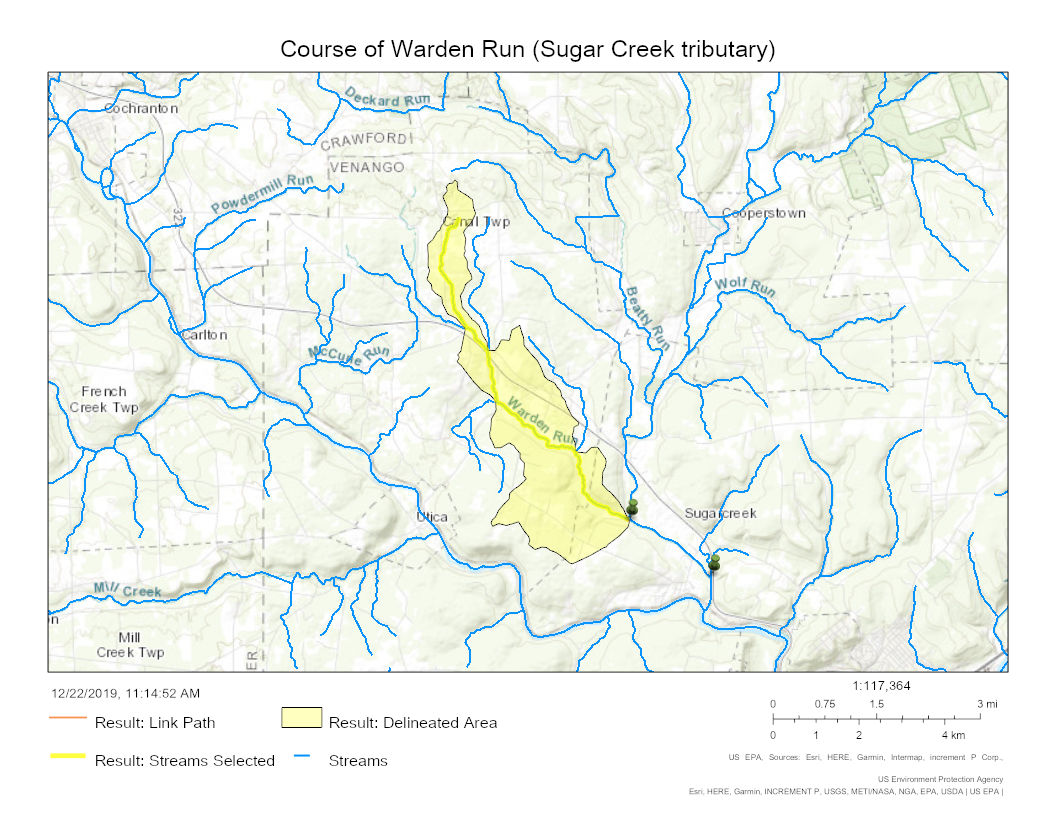
Course of Warden Run (Sugar Creek tributary) in Venango County, Pennsylvania

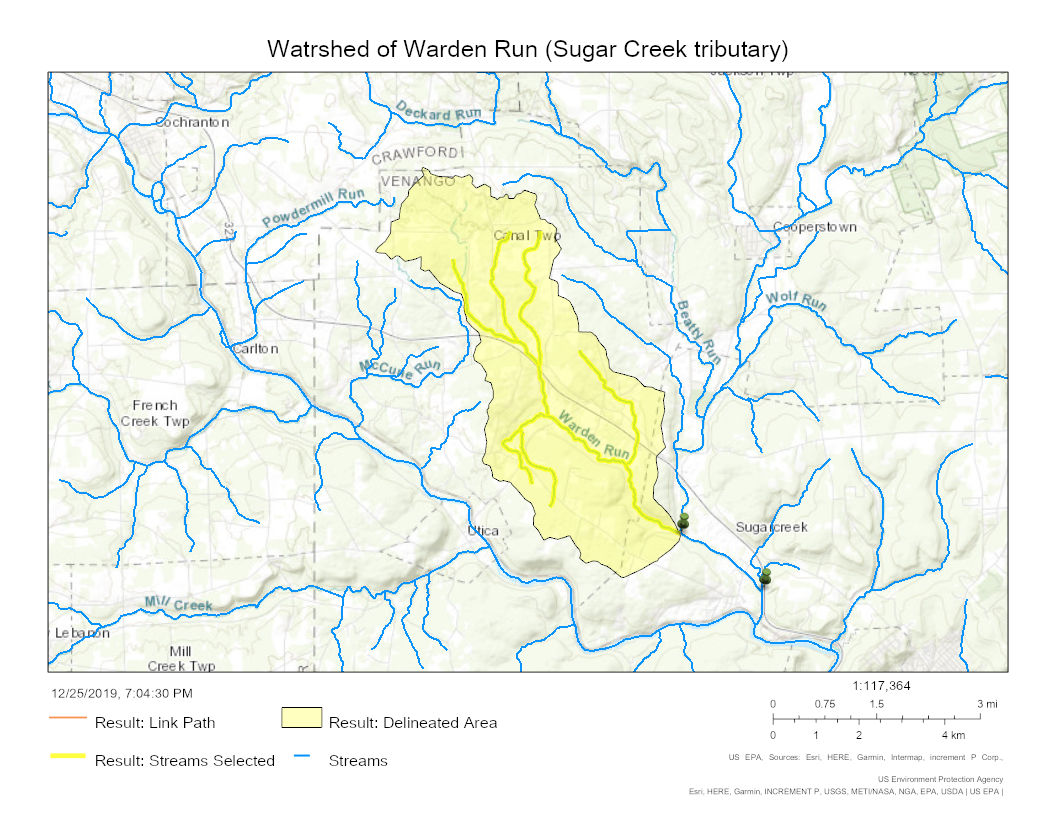
Watershed of Warden Run (Sugar Creek tributary) in Venango County, Pennsylvania
