= Patchel Run =

Stream in Pennsylvania, USA

Patchel Run Tributary to French Creek
- Location within Pennsylvania Location within the United States

Location
- Country: United States
- State: Pennsylvania
- County: Venango

Physical characteristics
- Source: Wolf Run divide
  - location: about 2 miles northwest of Galloway, Pennsylvania
  - coordinates: 41°27′22″N 079°50′56″W
  - elevation: 1,440 ft (440 m)
- Mouth: Foster Corner, Pennsylvania
  - location: French Creek
  - coordinates: 41°24′42″N 079°51′10″W
  - elevation: 984 ft (300 m)
- Length: 3.41 mi (5.49 km)
- Basin size: 6.76 square miles (17.5 km^{2})
- Discharge
  - location: French Creek
  - average: 11.85 cu ft/s (0.336 m^{3}/s) at mouth with French Creek

Basin features
- Progression: French Creek → Allegheny River → Ohio River → Mississippi River → Gulf of Mexico
- River system: Allegheny River
- Tributaries
  - left: unnamed tributaries
  - right: unnamed tributaries
- Bridges: US 322

Patchel Run is a stream in the U.S. state of Pennsylvania. It is a tributary to French Creek.

Patchel Run was named after Edward Patchel, an early settler.

== Variant names ==
According to the Geographic Names Information System, it has also been known historically as:

- Patchell Run
- Patcher Run

== Course ==
Patchel Run rises on the Wolf Run divide about 2 miles northwest of Galloway, Pennsylvania. Patchel Run then flows south to meet French Creek at Foster Corner, Pennsylvania.

== Watershed ==
Patchel Run drains 6.76 square miles (17.5 km^{2}) and has an average annual flow of 5.99 cfs (cubic feet/second). Rainfall averages 44.5 in (1,130.99 mm) per year. About 79% of the watershed is forested.

== See also ==
- List of rivers of Pennsylvania
- List of tributaries of the Allegheny River

== Additional images ==
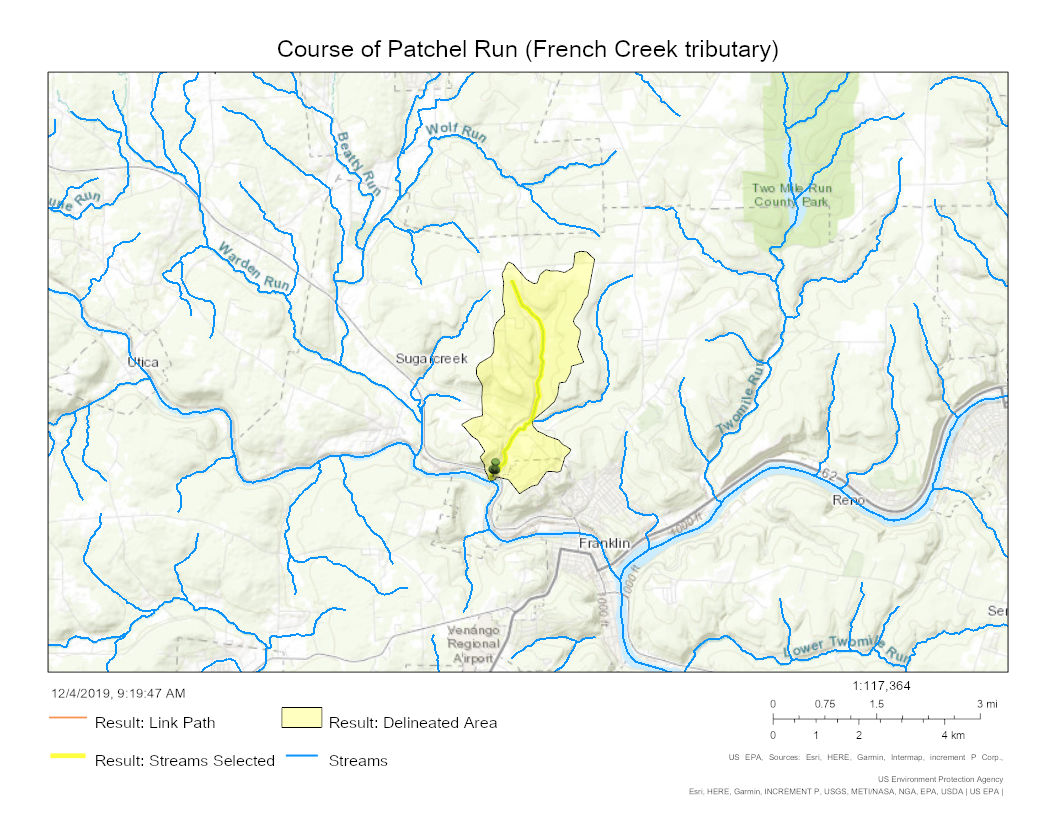
Course of Patchel Run (French Creek tributary)

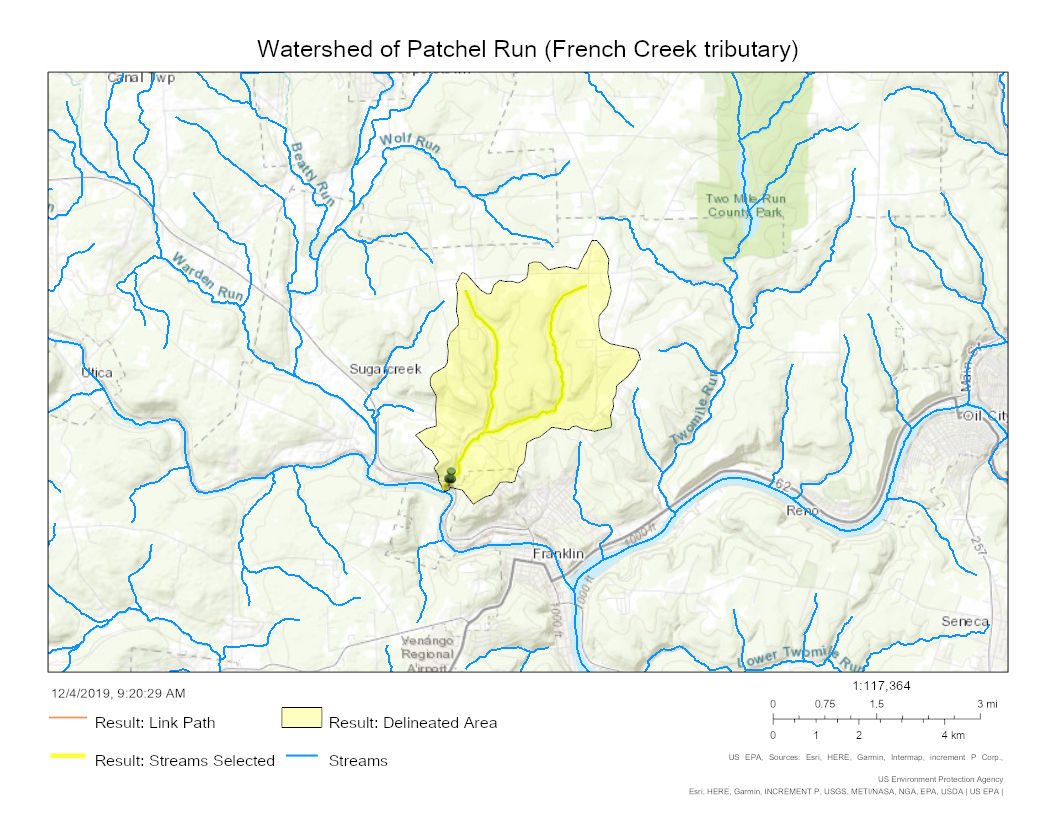
Watershed of Patchel Run (French Creek tributary)
