= Lake Creek (Sugar Creek tributary) =

Stream in Pennsylvania, USA

Lake Creek Tributary to Sugar Creek
- Location of Lake Creek mouth Lake Creek (Sugar Creek tributary) (the United States)

Location
- Country: United States
- State: Pennsylvania
- County: Venango; Crawford County

Physical characteristics
- Source: Woodcock Creek divide
  - location: about 2 miles northwest of Guys Mills, Pennsylvania
  - coordinates: 41°39′29″N 079°59′43″W
  - elevation: 1,538 ft (469 m)
- Mouth: Sugar Creek
  - location: Cooperstown, Pennsylvania
  - coordinates: 41°29′55″N 079°52′28″W
  - elevation: 1,122 ft (342 m)
- Length: 17.15 mi (27.60 km)
- Basin size: 34.36 square miles (89.0 km^{2})
- Discharge
  - location: Sugar Creek
  - average: 59.42 cu ft/s (1.683 m^{3}/s) at mouth with Sugar Creek

Basin features
- Progression: generally southeast
- River system: Allegheny River
- Tributaries
  - left: Trout Run
  - right: Brawley Run
- Waterbodies: Sugar Lake

Lake Creek is a 17.15 mi (27.60 km) long 3rd order tributary to Sugar Creek in Crawford and Venango County, Pennsylvania.

== Course ==
Lake Creek rises on the Woodcock Creek divide about 2 miles northwest of Guys Mills, Pennsylvania in Crawford County. Lake Creek then flows southeasterly into Venango County to meet Sugar Creek at Cooperstown, Pennsylvania.

== Watershed ==
Lake Creek drains 34.36 square miles (89.0 km^{2}) of area, receives about 44.6 in/year of precipitation, has a topographic wetness index of 466.17, and has an average water temperature of 7.88 °C. The watershed is 66% forested.

== See also ==
- List of rivers of Pennsylvania
- List of tributaries of the Allegheny River

== Additional Maps ==
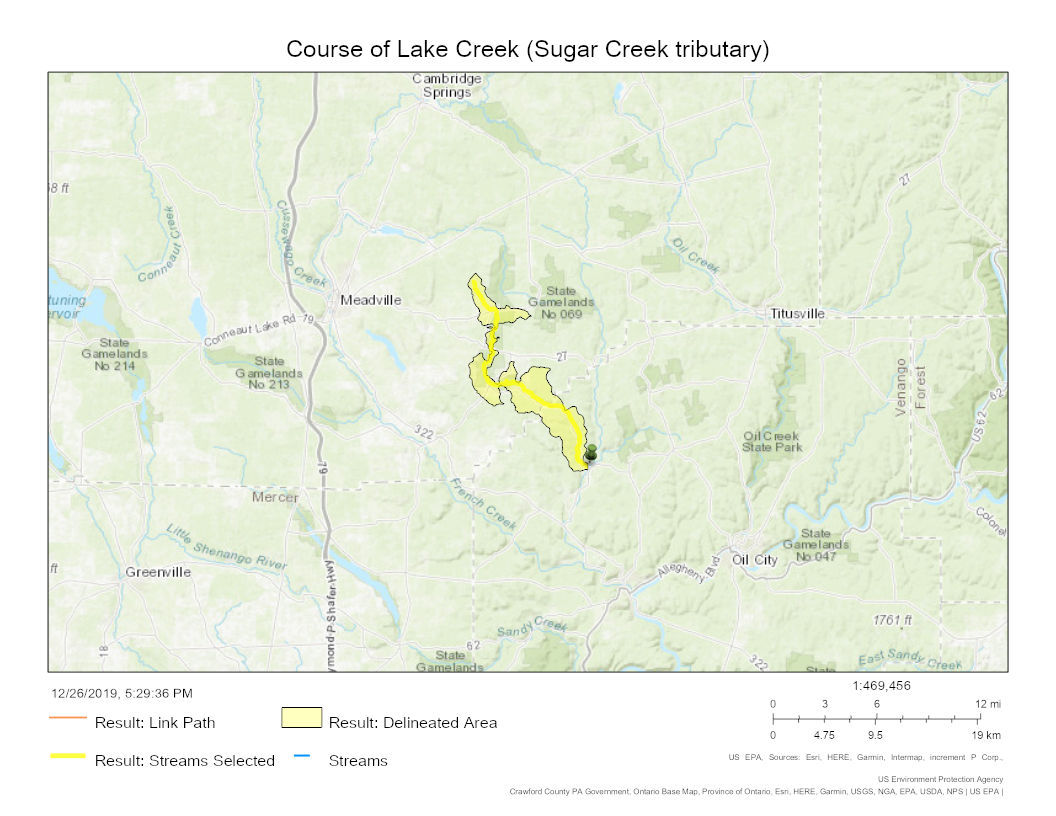
Course of Lake Creek (Sugar Creek tributary) in Crawford and Venango Counties, Pennsylvania

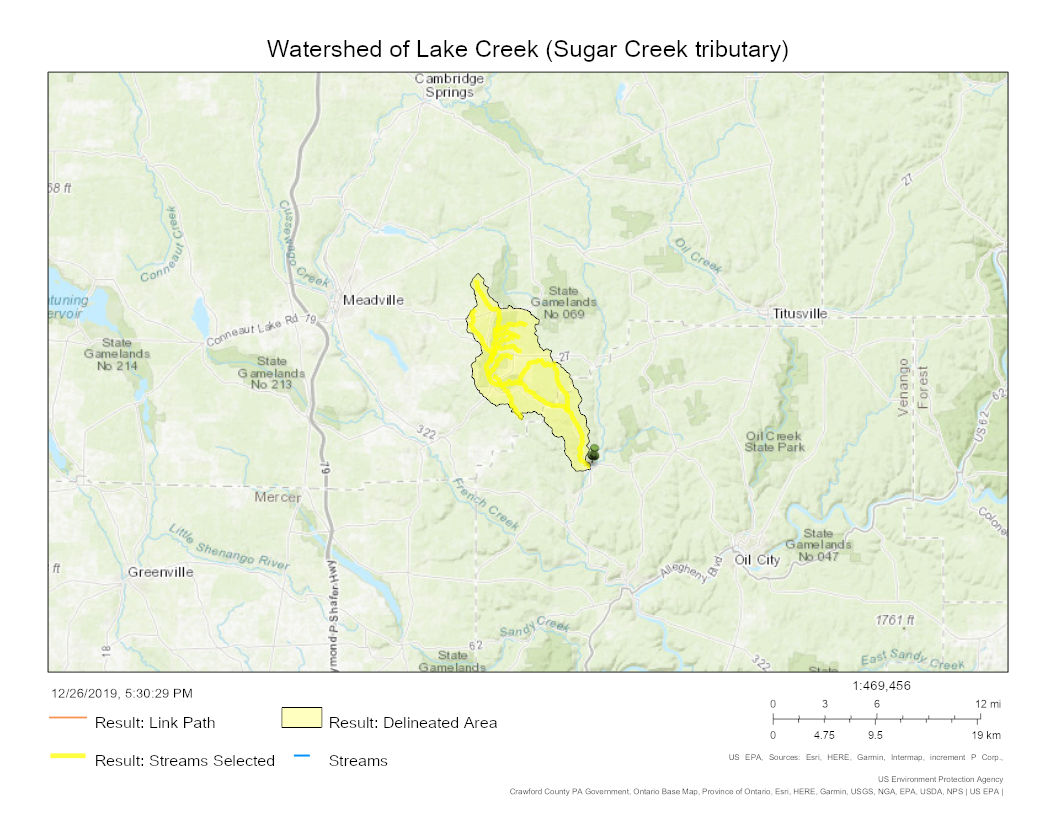
Watershed of Lake Creek (Sugar Creek tributary) in Crawford and Venango Counties, Pennsylvania
