= Navy Run =

Stream in Pennsylvania, USA

Navy Run Tributary to Muddy Creek
- Location of Navy Run mouth Navy Run (the United States)

Location
- Country: United States
- State: Pennsylvania
- County: Crawford

Physical characteristics
- Source: Sugar Creek divide
  - location: about 0.25 miles southwest of Steuben Corners, Pennsylvania
  - coordinates: 41°40′22″N 079°50′26″W
  - elevation: 1,600 ft (490 m)
- Mouth: Muddy Creek
  - location: about 2 miles southeast of Little Cooley, Pennsylvania
  - coordinates: 41°43′21″N 079°52′16″W
  - elevation: 1,210 ft (370 m)
- Length: 4.59 mi (7.39 km)
- Basin size: 3.70 square miles (9.6 km^{2})
- Discharge
  - location: Muddy Creek
  - average: 7.11 cu ft/s (0.201 m^{3}/s) at mouth with Muddy Creek

Basin features
- Progression: north and northwest
- River system: Allegheny River
- Tributaries
  - left: unnamed tributaries
  - right: unnamed tributaries
- Bridges: Tryonville Road, Armstrong Road, Drake Hill Road

Navy Run is a 4.59 mi (7.39 km) long 1st order tributary to Muddy Creek in Crawford County, Pennsylvania. This is the only stream of this name in the United States.

== Course ==
Navy Run rises about 0.25 miles southwest of Steuben Corners, Pennsylvania, and then flows north and northwest to join Muddy Creek about 2 miles southeast of Little Cooley, Pennsylvania.

== Watershed ==
Navy Run drains 3.70 square miles (9.6 km^{2}) of area, receives about 45.2 in/year of precipitation, has a wetness index of 446.28, and is about 41% forested.

== See also ==
- List of rivers of Pennsylvania
