= Bridge in Rockdale Township =

- U.S. National Register of Historic Places
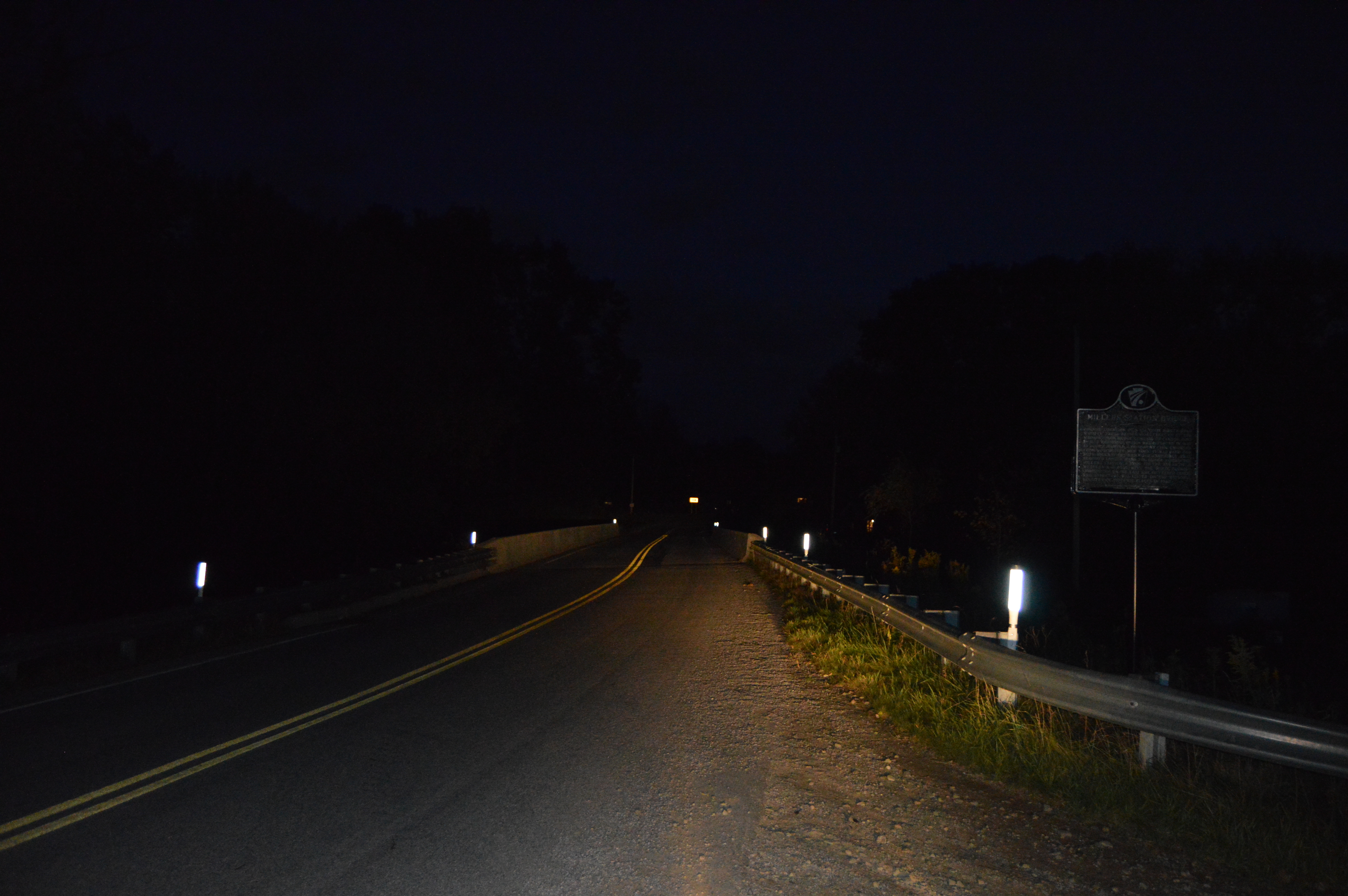
- Concrete girder bridge that has replaced the historic truss bridge

- Location within Pennsylvania Location within the United States
- Location: Legislative Route 20076 over French Creek, Rockdale Township, Pennsylvania
- Coordinates: 41°48′37″N 79°59′3″W
- Area: less than one acre
- Built: 1887
- Built by: Wrought Iron Bridge Co.
- Architectural style: Pratt truss
- MPS: Highway Bridges Owned by the Commonwealth of Pennsylvania, Department of Transportation TR
- NRHP reference No.: 88000829
- Added to NRHP: June 22, 1988

Bridge in Rockdale Township was a historic metal truss bridge spanning French Creek at Rockdale Township, Crawford County, Pennsylvania. It was built in 1887, and was a single span, double intersection bridge measuring 129-foot-long (39 m). It was built by the Wrought Iron Bridge Company of Canton, Ohio.

It was added to the National Register of Historic Places in 1988.
