= Lick Run (Sugar Creek tributary) =

Stream in Pennsylvania, USA

Lick Run Tributary to Sugar Creek
- Location of Lick Run mouth Lick Run (Sugar Creek tributary) (the United States)

Location
- Country: United States
- State: Pennsylvania
- County: Venango

Physical characteristics
- Source: Patchel Run and Wolf Run divide
  - location: about 2 miles northeast of Sugarcreek, Pennsylvania
  - coordinates: 41°27′20″N 079°51′14″W
  - elevation: 1,420 ft (430 m)
- Mouth: Sugar Creek
  - location: Sugar Creek, Pennsylvania
  - coordinates: 41°25′31″N 079°52′31″W
  - elevation: 1,014 ft (309 m)
- Length: 2.63 mi (4.23 km)
- Basin size: 2.49 square miles (6.4 km^{2})
- Discharge
  - location: Sugar Creek
  - average: 4.37 cu ft/s (0.124 m^{3}/s) at mouth with Sugar Creek

Basin features
- Progression: south
- River system: Allegheny River
- Tributaries
  - left: unnamed tributaries
  - right: unnamed tributaries

Lick Run is a 2.63 mi (4.23 km) long 2nd order tributary to Sugar Creek in Venango County, Pennsylvania.

== Course ==
Lick Run rises on the Patchel and Wolf Run divide about 2 miles northeast of Sugarcreek, Pennsylvania in Venango County. Lick Run then flows south to meet Sugar Creek at Sugar Creek, Pennsylvania in Venango County.

== Watershed ==
Lick Run drains 2.49 square miles (6.4 km^{2}) of area, receives about 44.1 in/year of precipitation, has a topographic wetness index of 417.44, and has an average water temperature of 8.26 °C. The watershed is 71.2% forested.
