= Carlton, Pennsylvania =

Unincorporated community in Pennsylvania, US

- Unincorporated community
- Location within Pennsylvania
- Coordinates: 41°28′34″N 80°01′11″W
- Country: United States
- State: Pennsylvania
- County: Mercer
- Elevation: 1,053 ft (321 m)
- Time zone: UTC-5 (Eastern (EST))
  - Summer (DST): UTC-4 (EDT)
- ZIP code: 16311
- Area code: 814
- GNIS feature ID: 1204927

Carlton is a village in Mercer County, Pennsylvania, United States. The community is located along French Creek, 3.4 miles (5.5 km) south-southeast of Cochranton. Carlton has a post office, with ZIP code 16311.
