= French Creek (Allegheny River tributary) =

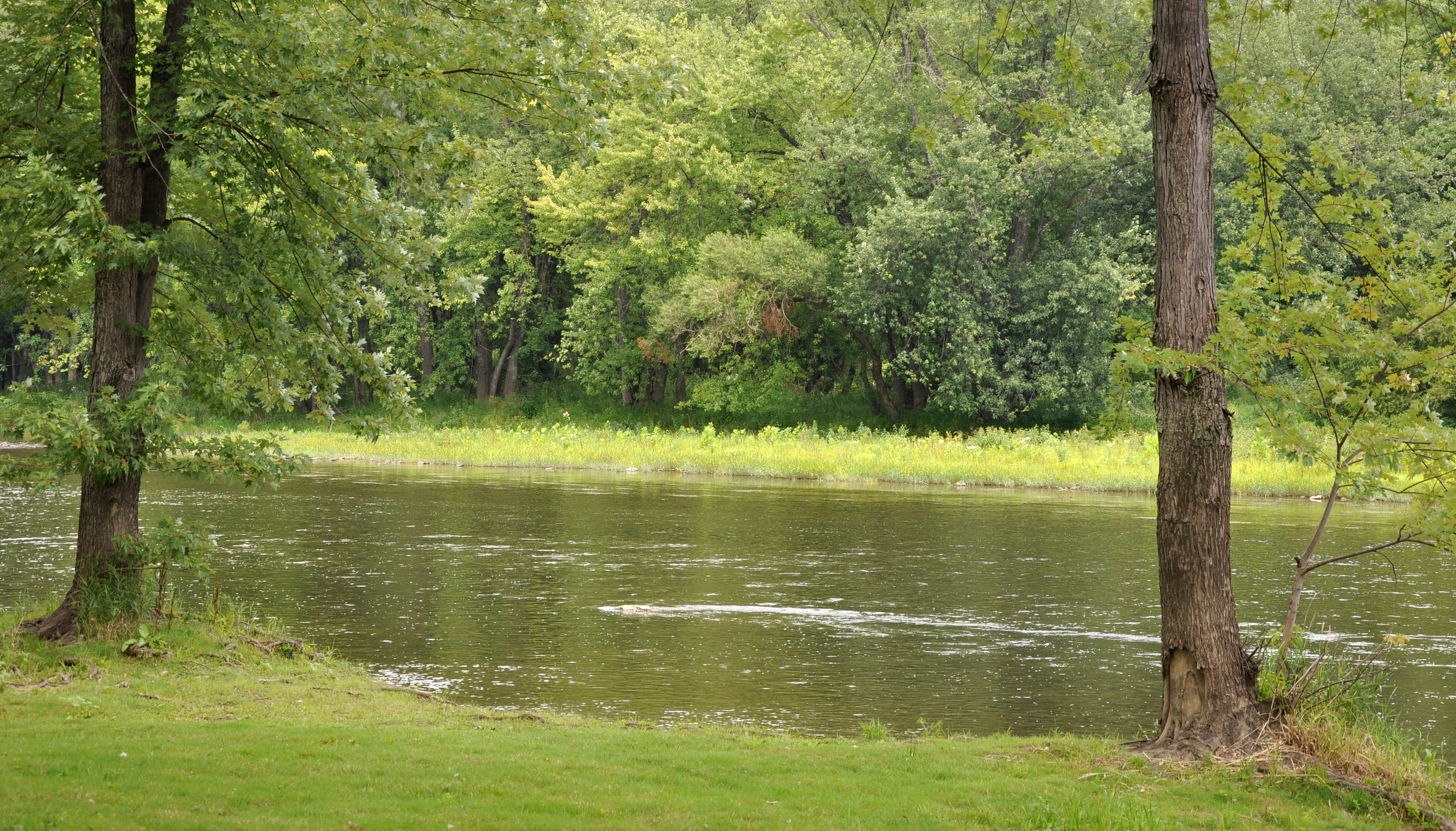
- Near the mouth at Franklin

- Location of the mouth of French Creek in Pennsylvania French Creek (Allegheny River tributary) (the United States)

Location
- Country: United States
- State: New York, Pennsylvania
- County: Chautauqua County, New York, and Erie, Crawford, Mercer, and Venango counties in Pennsylvania

Physical characteristics
- Source: North Harmony State Forest
  - location: near French Creek, New York, Chautauqua County, New York
  - coordinates: 42°06′14″N 79°31′52″W
  - elevation: 1,737 ft (529 m)
- Mouth: Allegheny River
  - location: Franklin, Pennsylvania
  - coordinates: 41°23′30″N 79°49′13″W
  - elevation: 961 ft (293 m)
- Length: 117 mi (188 km)
- Basin size: 1,270 sq mi (3,300 km^{2})
- Discharge
  - location: Utica
  - average: 2,019 cu ft/s (57.2 m^{3}/s)

Basin features
- Tributaries
  - left: Alder Bottom Creek; Beaver Meadow Brook; Herrick Creek; Hubbel Run; Alder Run; South Branch French Creek; Muddy Creek; Mohawk Run; Gravel Run; Woodcock Creek; Shellhammer Hollow; Bennyhoof Creek; Mill Run; Little Sugar Creek; Powdermill Run; McCune Run; Sugar Creek; Patchel Run
  - right: Black Brook; West Branch French Creek; Lake Pleasant Outlet; Wheeler Creek; LeBoeuf Creek; Campbell Run; Conneauttee Creek; Foulk Run; North Deer Creek; Mill Creek

French Creek (also known as the Venango River) is a tributary of the Allegheny River in northwestern Pennsylvania and western New York in the United States.

== Name ==
The stream has been sometimes called a river and sometimes a creek. It is thought that the stream's Seneca name, in nungash, was modified over time to Venango. The phrase in nungash may have derived from Onenga, the Seneca word for mink, or it may have stemmed from Winingus, the Delaware (Lenape) word for the same animal. Interpretations of Venango have included "crooked", and the Seneca chief Cornplanter suggested that in nungash referred to a particular carving on a tree along the stream. Venango was likewise the name of a native settlement at the creek's mouth, later the site of Franklin, Pennsylvania.

In the 18th century, the stream was an important link between the Great Lakes and the Ohio River. The French built Fort Presque Isle and Fort Le Boeuf to control the portage from the stream's headwaters to Lake Erie. They called the stream Rivière aux boeufs (Cattle River) because the bison in the vicinity reminded them of French cattle. In 1753, George Washington, still a British subject, was sent to deliver a message to Fort Le Boeuf asking the French to leave the region, as tensions increased before the French and Indian War. Washington called the stream French Creek rather than Beef Creek (another common rendering of Rivière aux Boeufs), and his version prevailed after the British won the Seven Years' War and took control of former French colonies in North America east of the Mississippi River.

== Course ==
French Creek begins near French Creek, New York, and flows about 117 miles (188 km) to the Allegheny River at Franklin, Pennsylvania. The creek's drainage basin covers 1,270 square miles (3,300 km^{2}). The watershed includes parts of Erie, Crawford, Venango, and Mercer counties in Pennsylvania as well as Chautauqua County in New York. Cities and towns along its main stem include Union City, Mill Village, Wattsburg, Cambridge Springs, Venango, Saegertown, Meadville, Cochranton, Utica, Sugarcreek, and Franklin, all in Pennsylvania.

== Fauna, water quality ==
Providing habitat to more than 80 species of fish and 26 species of freshwater mussels, French Creek is among the most biologically diverse streams in the northeastern United States.

Environmental concerns about the creek's water quality have been raised since at least the 1990s. Improvements to sewage treatment plants in Meadville, Cambridge Springs, and Saegertown have helped reduce the amount of chlorine and other chemicals entering the stream. Farm and highway runoff, malfunctioning septic systems, erosion, sedimentation, invasive species, and damaged riparian zones are other problems affecting the creek. The French Creek Project, organized in 1995, sponsors French Creek music festivals, ecology tours, and watershed classes for the public.

== Awards ==
The creek won the Pennsylvania Department of Conservation and Natural Resources award for River of the Year in 2003.

The creek was again named River of the Year for 2022. The citation reads:

"French Creek is one of the most biologically diverse waterways of its size in the United States, meandering 117 miles from its headwaters in southern New York through four Pennsylvania counties to the Allegheny River,” according to the release. “The creek is home to 27 species of freshwater mussels, more than 80 species of fish, and numerous waterfowl and songbird species, including bald eagles and four Audubon-designated Important Bird Areas (IBAs). French Creek is also home to the Eastern Hellbender, the largest species of salamander in North America, which was recently named the official amphibian of Pennsylvania.”

== See also ==
- Bridge in Rockdale Township
- Fort Machault
- Fort Venango
- List of rivers of New York
- List of rivers of Pennsylvania
- List of tributaries of the Allegheny River
