= Sugar Creek (French Creek tributary) =

Stream in Pennsylvania, USA

Sugar Creek Tributary to French Creek
- Location of Sugar Creek mouth Sugar Creek (French Creek tributary) (the United States)

Location
- Country: United States
- State: Pennsylvania
- Counties: Crawford; Venango

Physical characteristics
- Source: divide between Sugar Creek and Muddy Creek
  - location: about 0.5 miles south of Altenburg Corners, Pennsylvania
  - coordinates: 41°40′08″N 079°51′20″W
  - elevation: 1,560 ft (480 m)
- Mouth: French Creek
  - location: Sugar Creek, Pennsylvania
  - coordinates: 41°25′04″N 079°52′34″W
  - elevation: 1,000 ft (300 m)
- Length: 22.66 mi (36.47 km)
- Basin size: 167.8 square miles (435 km^{2})
- Discharge
  - location: French Creek
  - average: 278.85 cu ft/s (7.896 m^{3}/s) at mouth with French Creek

Basin features
- Progression: French Creek → Allegheny River → Ohio River → Mississippi River → Gulf of Mexico
- River system: Allegheny River
- Tributaries
  - left: Dry Run; East Branch Sugar Creek; Wolf Run; Lick Run
  - right: West Branch; Lake Creek; Beatty Run; Foster Run; Warden Run

Sugar Creek is a 22.66 mi (36.47 km) long 4th order tributary to French Creek in Venango County, Pennsylvania that rises in Crawford County, Pennsylvania.

== Course ==
Sugar Creek rises on the Muddy Creek divide about 0.5 miles south of Altenburg Corners, Pennsylvania in Crawford County. Sugar Creek then flows south to meet French Creek at Sugar Creek, Pennsylvania in Venango County.

== Watershed ==
Sugar Creek drains 167.8 square miles (435 km^{2}) of area, receives about 44.7 in/year of precipitation, has a topographic wetness index of 450.73, and has an average water temperature of 7.88 °C. The watershed is 67% forested.

== See also ==
- List of rivers of Pennsylvania
- List of tributaries of the Allegheny River

== Gallery ==
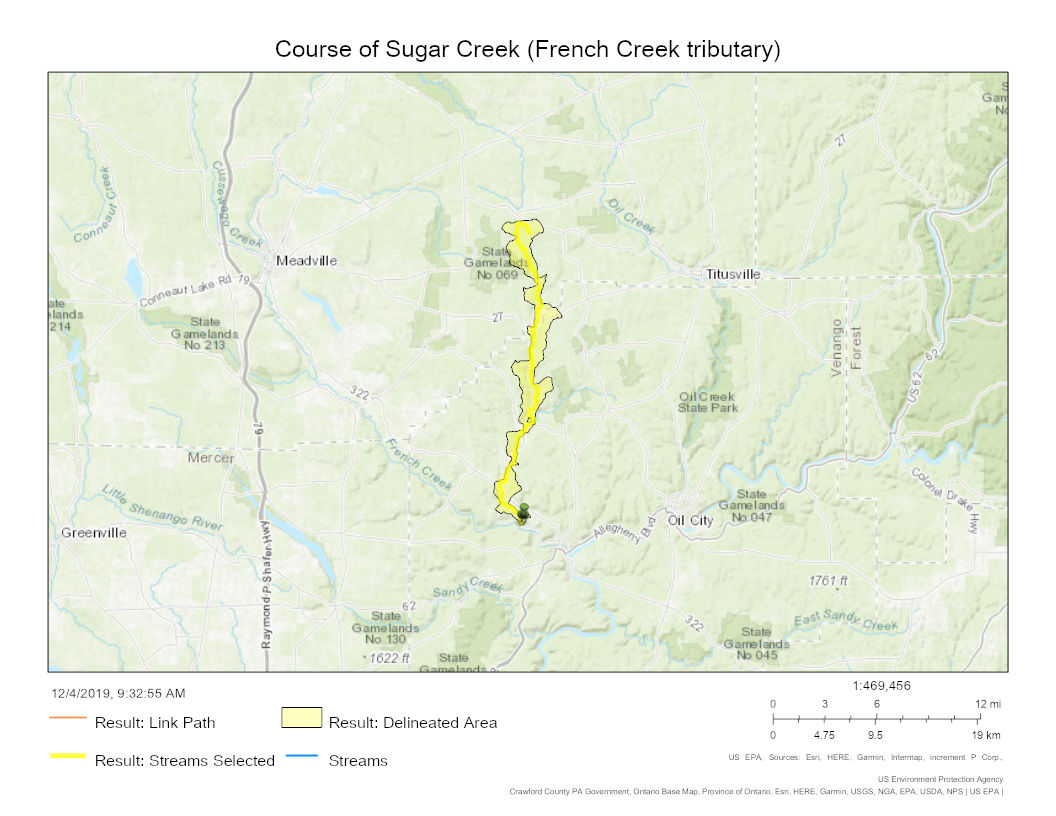
Course of Sugar Creek (French Creek tributary)

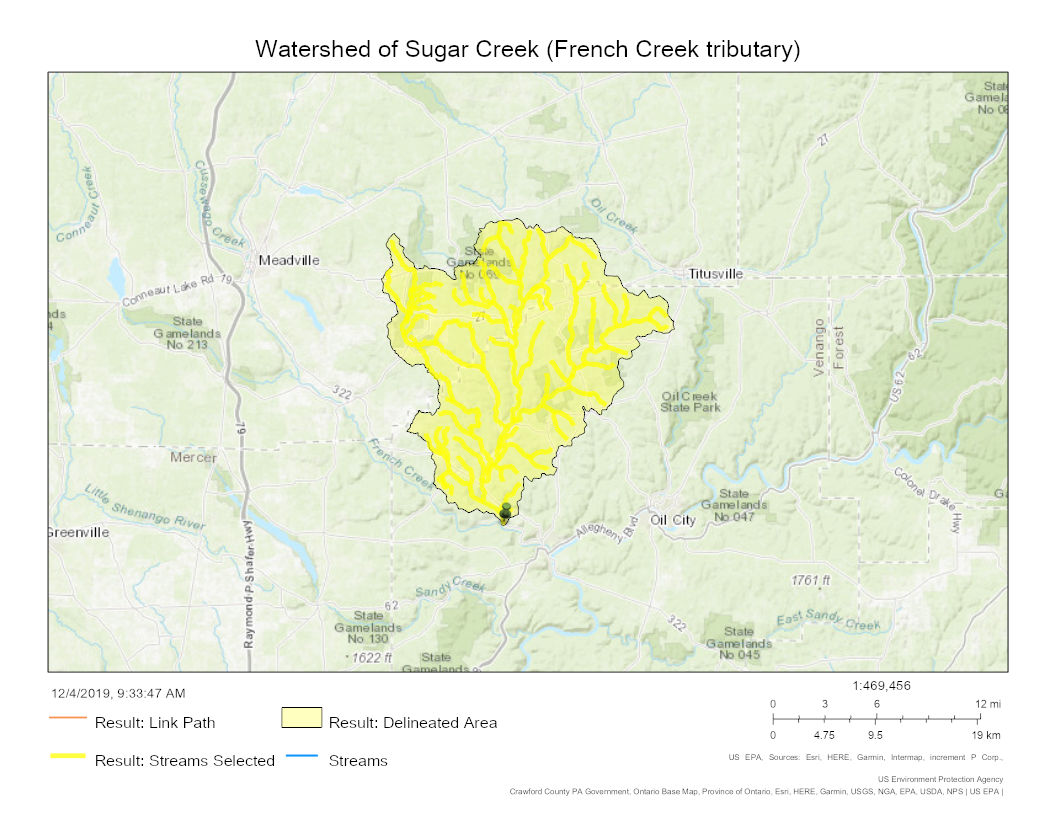
Watershed of Sugar Creek (French Creek tributary)
