= Muddy Creek (French Creek tributary) =

Stream in Pennsylvania, USA

Muddy Creek Tributary to French Creek
- Location of Muddy Creek mouth Muddy Creek (French Creek tributary) (the United States)

Location
- Country: United States
- State: Pennsylvania
- County: Crawford
- Borough: Townville

Physical characteristics
- Source: Woodcock Creek divide
  - location: about 0.5 miles north of South Richmond Corners, Pennsylvania
  - coordinates: 41°42′05″N 079°56′19″W
  - elevation: 1,505 ft (459 m)
- Mouth: French Creek
  - location: about 0.5 miles south of Millers Station, Pennsylvania
  - coordinates: 41°48′01″N 079°59′37″W
  - elevation: 1,138 ft (347 m)
- Length: 22.42 mi (36.08 km)
- Basin size: 495.85 square miles (1,284.2 km^{2})
- Discharge
  - location: French Creek
  - average: 146.44 cu ft/s (4.147 m^{3}/s) at mouth with French Creek

Basin features
- Progression: generally northwest
- River system: Allegheny River
- Tributaries
  - left: Mackey Run; Dead Creek
  - right: Navy Run; East Branch Muddy Creek; Federal Run
- Bridges: PA 408, Carpenter Road, Mercer Road, Centerville Road, Armstrong Road, Dewey Road, Three Bridges Road, Hamilton Road, PA 77, Teepleville Road, Eddie Road, Teepleville Road, Swamp Road, Johnstown Road

Muddy Creek is a 22.42 mi (36.08 km) long 4th order tributary to French Creek in Crawford County, Pennsylvania.

== Course ==
Muddy Creek rises about 0.5 miles north-northwest of S Richmond Corners, Pennsylvania, and then flows east and turns northwest to join French Creek about 0.5 miles south of Millers Station, Pennsylvania.

== Watershed ==
Muddy Creek drains 495.85 square miles (1,284.2 km^{2}) of area, receives about 45.2 in/year of precipitation, has a wetness index of 462.98, and is about 44% forested.

== See also ==
- List of rivers of Pennsylvania
