= Mohawk Run (French Creek tributary) =

Stream in Pennsylvania, USA

Mohawk Run Tributary to French Creek
- Location of Mohawk Run mouth Mohawk Run (French Creek tributary) (the United States)

Location
- Country: United States
- State: Pennsylvania
- County: Crawford

Physical characteristics
- Source: Gravel Run divide
  - location: pond about 2 miles west-northwest of Jewel Corners, Pennsylvania
  - coordinates: 41°45′03″N 080°01′43″W
  - elevation: 1,590 ft (480 m)
- Mouth: French Creek
  - location: about 0.25 miles northeast of Andersons Corner, Pennsylvania
  - coordinates: 41°48′03″N 080°00′19″W
  - elevation: 1,120 ft (340 m)
- Length: 5.26 mi (8.47 km)
- Basin size: 5.31 square miles (13.8 km^{2})
- Discharge
  - location: French Creek
  - average: 9.74 cu ft/s (0.276 m^{3}/s) at mouth with French Creek

Basin features
- Progression: French Creek → Allegheny River → Ohio River → Mississippi River → Gulf of Mexico
- River system: Allegheny River
- Tributaries
  - left: unnamed tributaries
  - right: unnamed tributaries
- Bridges: Yankee Hill Road, Greytown Hills Road, Jouver Road, Henry Road, PA 408, Johnstown Road

Mohawk Run is a 5.26 mi (8.47 km) long 2nd order tributary to French Creek in Crawford County, Pennsylvania, United States.

== Course ==
Mohawk Run rises in a pond about 2 miles west-northwest of Jewel Corners, Pennsylvania, and then flows north, turns east, then turns north again to join French Creek about 0.25 miles northeast of Anderson Corners.

== Watershed ==
Mohawk Run drains 5.31 square miles (13.8 km^{2}) of area, receives about 44.9 in/year of precipitation, has a wetness index of 459.85, and is about 60% forested.

== See also ==
- List of rivers of Pennsylvania
