= Beatty Run (Sugar Creek tributary) =

Stream in Pennsylvania, USA

Beatty Run Tributary to Sugar Creek
- Location of Beatty Run mouth Beatty Run (Sugar Creek tributary) (the United States)

Location
- Country: United States
- State: Pennsylvania
- County: Venango

Physical characteristics
- Source: Deckard Run divide
  - location: about 1 mile east of Deckard, Pennsylvania
  - coordinates: 41°31′23″N 079°56′35″W
  - elevation: 1,340 ft (410 m)
- Mouth: Sugar Creek
  - location: about 1 mile north of Wyattville, Pennsylvania
  - coordinates: 41°27′40″N 079°53′28″W
  - elevation: 1,070 ft (330 m)
- Length: 7.69 mi (12.38 km)
- Basin size: 8.64 square miles (22.4 km^{2})
- Discharge
  - location: Sugar Creek
  - average: 15.27 cu ft/s (0.432 m^{3}/s) at mouth with Sugar Creek

Basin features
- Progression: southeast
- River system: Allegheny River
- Tributaries
  - left: McCauley Run
  - right: unnamed tributaries

Beatty Run is a 7.69 mi (12.38 km) long 2nd order tributary to Sugar Creek in Venango County, Pennsylvania.

== Course ==
Beatty Run rises on the Deckard Run divide about 1 mile east of Deckard, Pennsylvania in Venango County. Beatty Run then flows southeast to meet Sugar Creek about 1 mile north of Wyattville, Pennsylvania in Venango County.

== Watershed ==
Beatty Run drains 8.64 square miles (22.4 km^{2}) of area, receives about 44.3 in/year of precipitation, has a topographic wetness index of 418.12, and has an average water temperature of 7.93 °C. The watershed is 71% forested.

== See also ==
- List of rivers of Pennsylvania
- List of tributaries of the Allegheny River

== Additional images ==
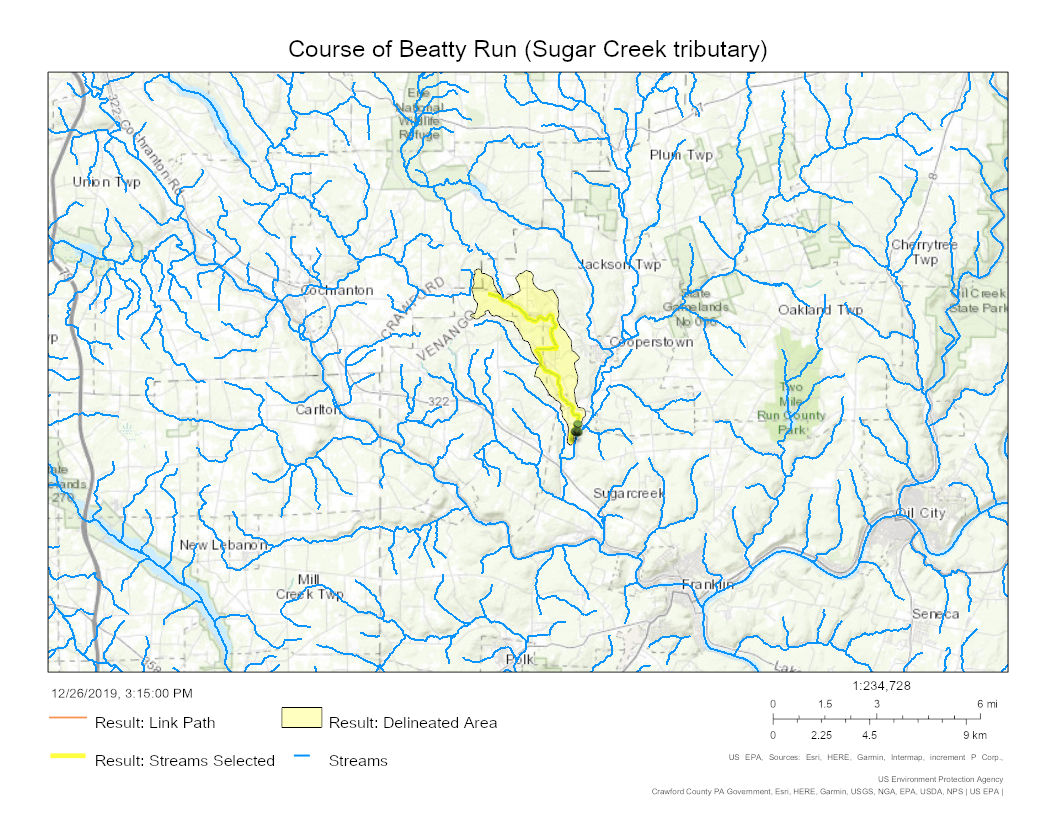
Course of Beatty Run (Sugar Creek tributary) in Venango County, Pennsylvania

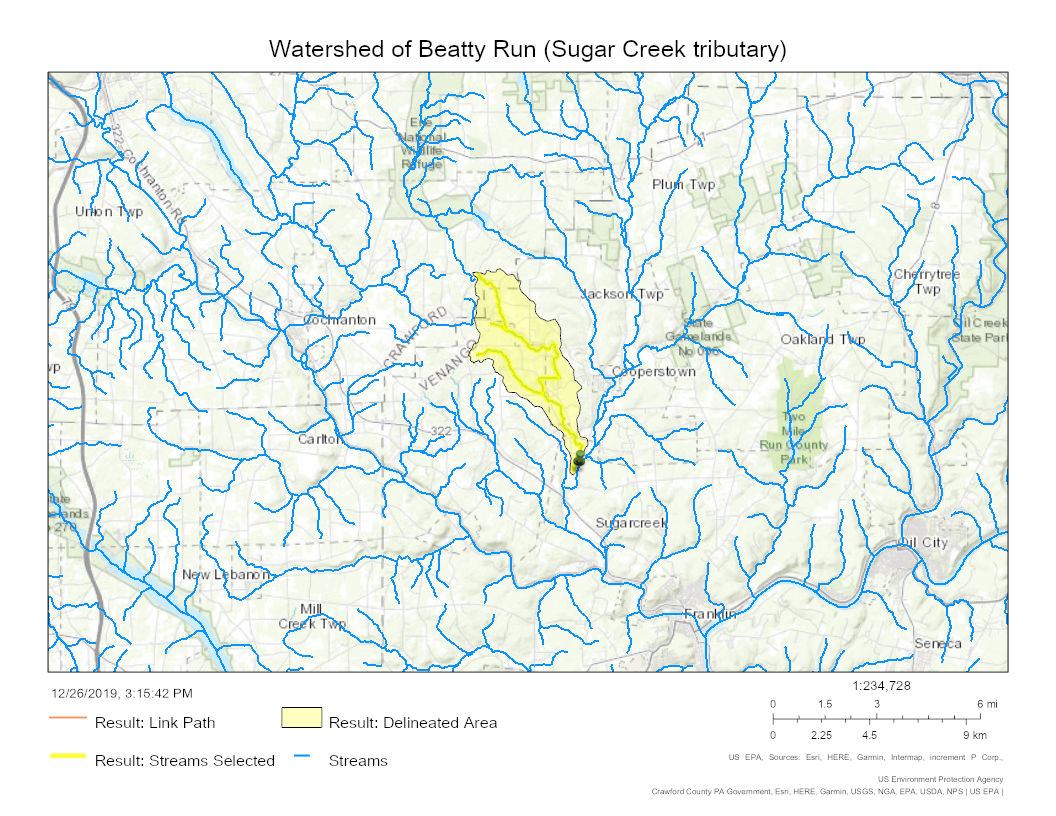
Watershed of Beatty Run (Sugar Creek tributary) in Venango County, Pennsylvania
