= Woodcock Creek (French Creek tributary) =

Stream in Pennsylvania, USA

Woodcock Creek Tributary to French Creek
- Location of Woodcock Creek mouth Woodcock Creek (French Creek tributary) (the United States)

Location
- Country: United States
- State: Pennsylvania
- County: Crawford
- Borough: Saegertown

Physical characteristics
- Source: West Branch Sugar Creek divide
  - location: about 0.5 miles east of Turkey Track Corners, Pennsylvania
  - coordinates: 41°38′24″N 079°54′33″W
  - elevation: 1,600 ft (490 m)
- Mouth: French Creek
  - location: Saegertown, Pennsylvania
  - coordinates: 41°42′24″N 080°08′41″W
  - elevation: 1,098 ft (335 m)
- Length: 19.68 mi (31.67 km)
- Basin size: 50.96 square miles (132.0 km^{2})
- Discharge
  - location: French Creek
  - average: 97.91 cu ft/s (2.773 m^{3}/s) at mouth with French Creek

Basin features
- Progression: French Creek → Allegheny River → Ohio River → Mississippi River → Gulf of Mexico
- River system: Allegheny River
- Tributaries
  - left: Spald Run
  - right: Bossard Run
- Bridges: Carpenter Road, Maplewood Road, Gilbert Road, McFadden Road, Guys Mill Road, Hanks Road, Hickory Corners Road, Lyona Road, Castile Road, PA 77, Price Road, Saegertown Street, Shultz Road, PA 86, Craig Road, Park Avenue

Woodcock Creek is a 19.68 mi (31.67 km) long 4th order tributary to French Creek in Crawford County, Pennsylvania.

== Course ==
Woodcock Creek rises about 0.5 miles east of Turkey Track Corners, Pennsylvania, and then flows generally north and northwest to join French Creek just south of Saegertown, Pennsylvania.

== Watershed ==
Woodcock Creek drains 50.96 square miles (132.0 km^{2}) of area, receives about 44.9 in/year of precipitation, has a wetness index of 473.36, and is about 60% forested.

== See also ==
- List of rivers of Pennsylvania
