= Federal Run =

Stream in Pennsylvania, USA

Federal Run Tributary to Muddy Creek
- Location of Federal Run mouth Federal Run (the United States)

Location
- Country: United States
- State: Pennsylvania
- County: Crawford

Physical characteristics
- Source: Kelley Run divide
  - location: pond about 0.5 miles northeast of Kings Corners, Pennsylvania
  - coordinates: 41°44′51″N 079°54′07″W
  - elevation: 1,648 ft (502 m)
- Mouth: Muddy Creek
  - location: about 0.25 miles north-northwest of Little Cooley, Pennsylvania
  - coordinates: 41°49′09″N 079°53′40″W
  - elevation: 1,175 ft (358 m)
- Length: 6.88 mi (11.07 km)
- Basin size: 14.29 square miles (37.0 km^{2})
- Discharge
  - location: Muddy Creek
  - average: 37.14 cu ft/s (1.052 m^{3}/s) at mouth with Muddy Creek

Basin features
- Progression: generally south
- River system: Allegheny River
- Tributaries
  - left: Little Federal Run
  - right: unnamed tributaries
- Bridges: King Road, Rockdale Road (x2), Forest Home Road, Brown Hill Road, Mickle Hollow Road, Athens Road, Dobbs Road (x2), S. Browns Hill Road

Federal Run is a 6.88 mi (11.07 km) long 3rd order tributary to Muddy Creek in Crawford County, Pennsylvania. This is the only stream of this name in the United States.

== Course ==
Federal Run rises about 0.25 miles north-northwest of Kings Corners, Pennsylvania, and then flows southerly to join Muddy Creek about 0.5 miles north-northwest of Little Cooley, Pennsylvania.

== Watershed ==
Federal Run drains 14.29 square miles (37.0 km^{2}) of area, receives about 45.6 in/year of precipitation, has a wetness index of 442.71, and is about 43% forested.

== See also ==
- List of rivers of Pennsylvania
