= Utica, Pennsylvania =

Borough in Pennsylvania, US

- Borough
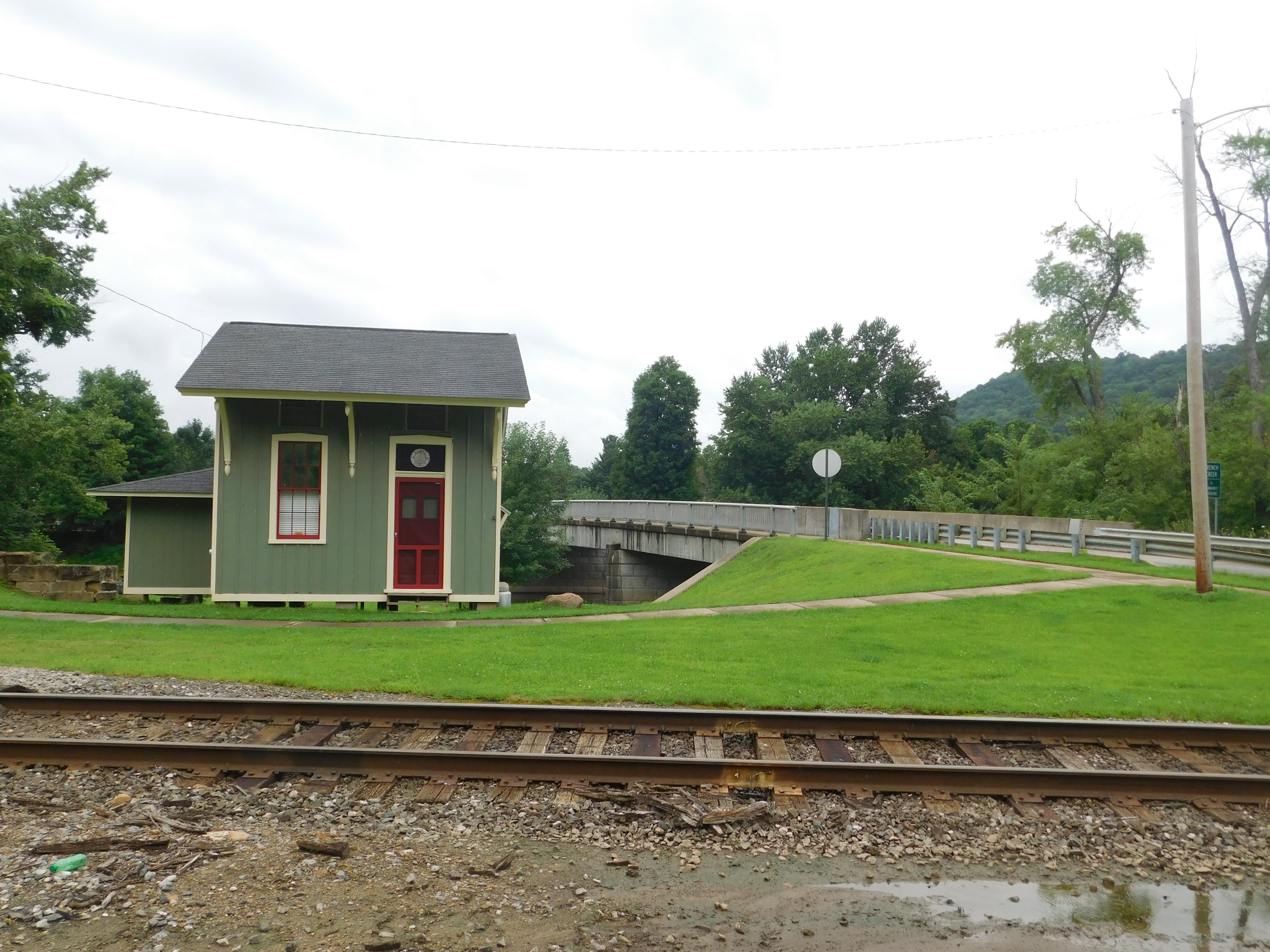
- Former Utica station along the Erie Railroad

- Location of Utica in Venango County, Pennsylvania.
- Coordinates: 41°26′11″N 79°57′23″W
- Country: United States
- State: Pennsylvania
- County: Venango
- Settled: 1830
- Incorporated: 1863

Government
  - Type: Borough Council

Area
  - Total: 1.46 sq mi (3.78 km^{2})
  - Land: 1.40 sq mi (3.62 km^{2})
  - Water: 0.058 sq mi (0.15 km^{2})

Population (2020)
  - Total: 184 ▼
  - Estimate (2021): 182
  - Density: 120.8/sq mi (46.66/km^{2})
- Time zone: UTC-5 (Eastern (EST))
  - Summer (DST): UTC-4 (EDT)
- Zip code: 16362
- Area code: 814
- FIPS code: 42-79472
- Website: https://uticaborough.com/

Utica is a borough that is located in Venango County, Pennsylvania, United States. The population was 184 at the time of the 2020 census.

The current mayor of Utica is MaryAnn Schell.

== Geography ==
Utica is located at 41°26′11″N 79°57′23″W (41.436319, -79.956341).

According to the United States Census Bureau, the borough has a total area of 1.4 square miles (3.6 km^{2}), of which 1.3 square miles (3.4 km^{2}) is land and 0.04 square miles (0.10 km^{2}) (2.90%) is water.

== Demographics ==
Historical population
Census	Pop.	Note	%±
1870	225		—
1880	301		33.8%
1890	321		6.6%
1900	268		−16.5%
1910	265		−1.1%
1920	251		−5.3%
1930	206		−17.9%
1940	216		4.9%
1950	264		22.2%
1960	274		3.8%
1970	281		2.6%
1980	255		−9.3%
1990	242		−5.1%
2000	211		−12.8%
2010	189		−10.4%
2020	184		−2.6%
2021 (est.)	182	▼	−1.1%

As of the census of 2000, there were 211 people, 79 households, and 57 families residing in the borough. The population density was 157.2 inhabitants per square mile (60.7/km^{2}). There were 122 housing units at an average density of 90.9 per square mile (35.1/km^{2}).

The racial makeup of the borough was 100.00% White.

There were 79 households, out of which 43.0% had children under the age of eighteen living with them; 48.1% were married couples living together, 16.5% had a female householder with no husband present, and 27.8% were non-families. 26.6% of all households were made up of individuals, and 8.9% had someone living alone who was sixty-five years of age or older.

The average household size was 2.67 and the average family size was 3.26.

Within the borough, the population was spread out, with 36.5% of residents who were under the age of 18, 3.3% from 18 to 24, 25.1% from 25 to 44, 23.2% from 45 to 64, and 11.8% who were 65 years of age or older. The median age was 34 years.

For every 100 females there were 83.5 males. For every 100 females age 18 and over, there were 88.7 males.

The median income for a household in the borough was $22,875, and the median income for a family was $23,929. Males had a median income of $29,063 compared with that of $19,250 for females.

The per capita income for the borough was $11,435.

Approximately 30.4% of families and 29.2% of the population were living below the poverty line, including 48.1% of those who were under the age of eighteen. None of the residents who were aged sixty-five or older were living in poverty.
