= Pine Run (South Branch French Creek tributary) =

Stream in Pennsylvania, USA

Pine Run Tributary to South Branch French Creek
- Location of the mouth of Pine Run Pine Run (South Branch French Creek tributary) (the United States)

Location
- Country: United States
- State: Pennsylvania
- County: Erie

Physical characteristics
- Source: divide between Bentley Run and Beaver Run
  - location: about 2 miles northeast of Union City, Pennsylvania
  - coordinates: 41°56′07″N 079°47′29″W
  - elevation: 1,580 ft (480 m)
- Mouth: South Branch French Creek
  - location: east of Union City, Pennsylvania
  - coordinates: 41°53′33″N 079°47′07″W
  - elevation: 1,309 ft (399 m)
- Length: 3.3 mi (5.3 km)
- Basin size: 2.0 square miles (5.2 km^{2})
- Discharge
  - location: 1 mile east of Union City, Pennsylvania
  - average: 5.45 cu ft/s (0.154 m^{3}/s) at mouth with South Branch French Creek

Basin features
- Progression: South Branch French Creek → French Creek → Allegheny River → Ohio River → Mississippi River → Gulf of Mexico
- River system: Allegheny River
- Tributaries
  - left: unnamed tributaries
  - right: unnamed tributaries
- Bridges: US 6, Elgin Road, Riley Siding Road

Pine Run is a 3.3 mi (5.3 km) long tributary to South Branch French Creek in Erie County, Pennsylvania. It is classed as a 1st order stream on the EPA waters Geoviewer site.

== Course ==
Pine Run rises in Union Township of southern Erie County, Pennsylvania and flows southwest towards Union City, Pennsylvania.

== Watershed ==
Pine Run drains 2.0 square miles of Erie Drift Plain (glacial geology). The watershed receives an average of 46.5 in/year of precipitation.

== Additional images ==
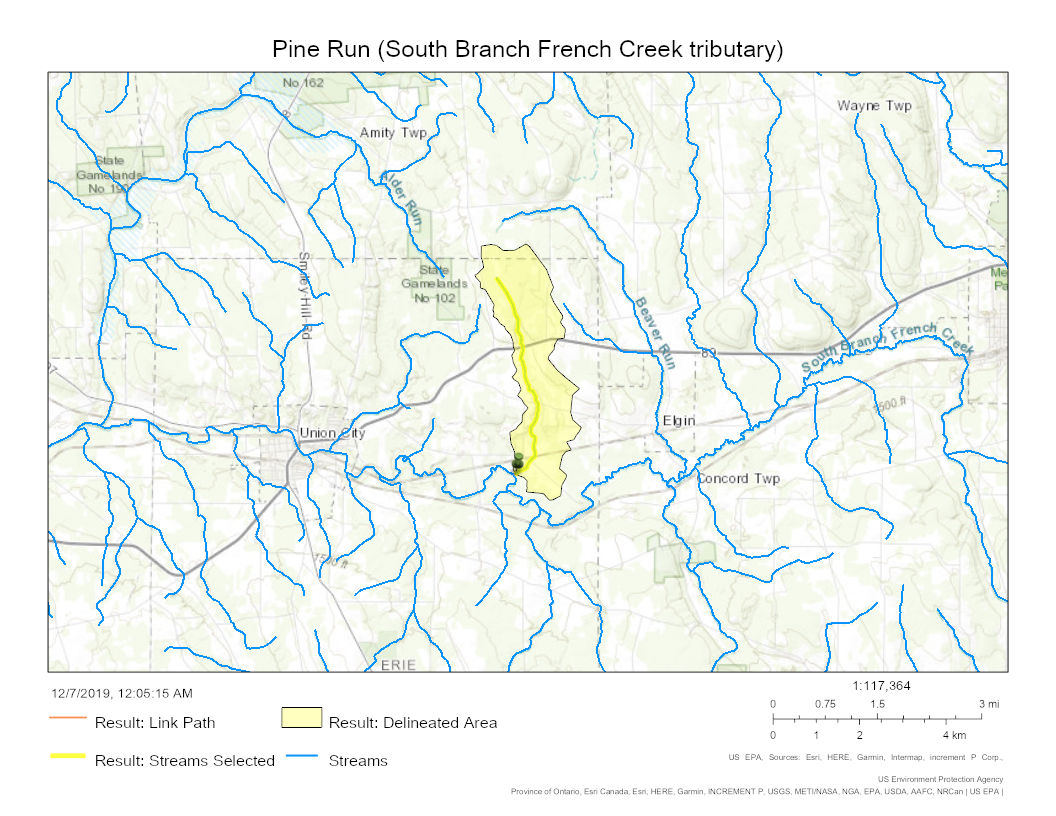
Pine Run (South Branch French Creek tributary)
