= WHYP =

WHYP may refer to:

- WHYP-LP, a low-power radio station (98.9 FM) licensed to serve Corry, Pennsylvania, United States
- WWCB, a radio station (1370 AM) licensed to serve Corry, Pennsylvania, which held the call sign WHYP from 2010 to 2013
