= Corry Area School District =

School district in Pennsylvania

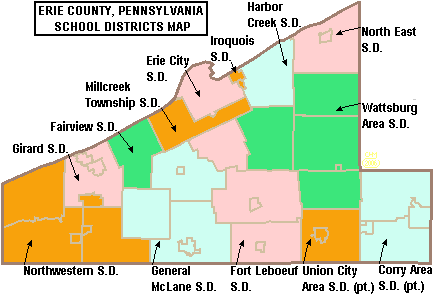

Address
- 540 East Pleasant Street Corry, Crawford, Erie, Warren, Pennsylvania, 16407; United States

District information
- Type: Public

Students and staff
- District mascot: Beavers

Other information
- Website: https://www.corrysd.net/

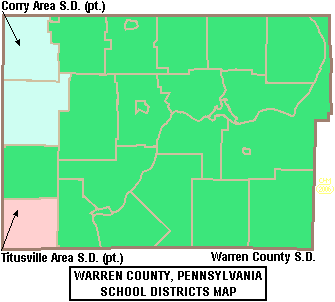
Corry Area School District region in Warren County

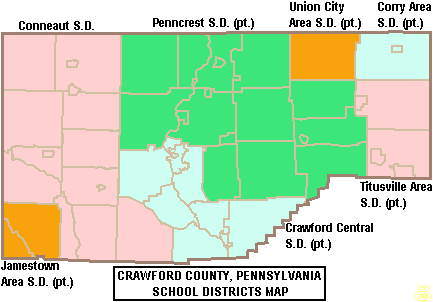
Corry Area School District region in Crawford County

The Corry Area School District is a midsized, rural, public school district which spans portions of three counties in northwestern Pennsylvania. In Crawford County it covers the Borough of Spartansburg and Sparta Township. In Erie County it covers the City of Corry, the Borough of Elgin and Concord Township and Wayne Township. In Warren County it covers Columbus Township and Spring Creek Township. The district encompasses 241 square miles. According to 2000 federal census data, it serves a resident population of 14,883. In 2009, the district residents’ per capita income was $16,881, while the median family income was $40,063. In the Commonwealth, the median family income was $49,501 and the United States median family income was $49,445, in 2010.

The district operates Corry Area High School (9th through12th), Corry Area Middle School (6th through 8th), Corry Intermediate School (3rd through 5th), \ Corry Primary School (Pre-K through 2nd) The district also operates the Corry Area Career and Technical Center.
