= WHYP-LP =

- Corry, Pennsylvania; United States
- Broadcast area: Corry; Union City; Elgin; Spartansburg
- Frequency: 98.9 MHz
- Branding: Channel 98-9 FM

Programming
- Format: Active and alternative rock

Ownership
- Owner: Corry Area Radio Service

History
- First air date: January 26, 2017

Technical information
- Licensing authority: FCC
- Facility ID: 195580
- Class: L1
- Power: 100 watts
- HAAT: 26.4 meters (87 ft)
- Transmitter coordinates: 41°54′27.80″N 79°39′4.50″W

Links
- Public license information: LMS
- Webcast: Listen live
- Website: channel989.org

WHYP-LP is an active rock and alternative rock formatted broadcast radio station. The station is licensed to Corry, Pennsylvania and also serves three nearby communities: Union City, Elgin, and Spartansburg. WHYP-LP is owned and operated by Corry Area Radio Service.
