= Union City Area School District =

School district in Pennsylvania, United States

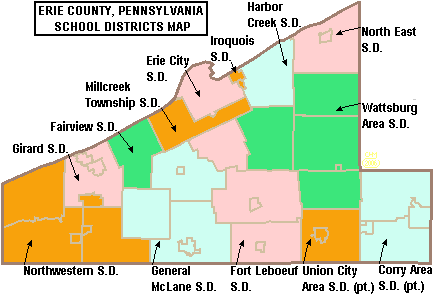

Address
- 107 Concord Street Union City, Pennsylvania, 16438; United States

District information
- Type: Public
- Grades: PreK–12
- NCES District ID: 4224090

Students and staff
- Students: 1,019
- Teachers: 82.55 (FTE)
- Staff: 127.96 (FTE)
- Student–teacher ratio: 12.34

Other information
- Website: www.ucasd.org

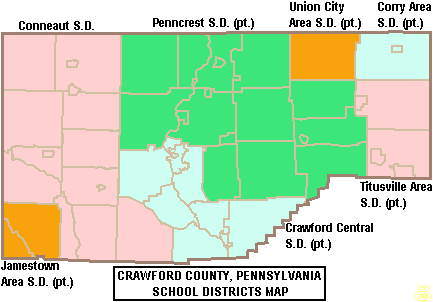
Union City Area School District region in Crawford County

The Union Area School District is a public school district serving Union City and Union Township in Erie County, Pennsylvania and Bloomfield Township in Crawford County, Pennsylvania. It has one elementary school (pre-k through 5th grade) and a combined middle school and high school (6th through 12th grade).
