= Beaver Run (South Branch French Creek tributary) =

Stream in Pennsylvania, USA

Beaver Run Tributary to South Branch French Creek
- Location of Beaver Run mouth Beaver Run (South Branch French Creek tributary) (the United States)

Location
- Country: United States
- State: Pennsylvania
- County: Erie
- Borough: Elgin

Physical characteristics
- Source: divide between Beaver Run and Bentley Run
  - location: about 3 miles northwest of Beaver Dam, Pennsylvania
  - coordinates: 41°56′35″N 079°47′25″W
  - elevation: 1,505 ft (459 m)
- Mouth: South Branch French Creek
  - location: about 0.5 miles south of Elgin, Pennsylvania
  - coordinates: 41°53′27″N 079°44′22″W
  - elevation: 1,342 ft (409 m)
- Length: 5.80 mi (9.33 km)
- Basin size: 6.87 square miles (17.8 km^{2})
- Discharge
  - location: South Branch French Creek
  - average: 13.55 cu ft/s (0.384 m^{3}/s) at mouth with South Branch French Creek

Basin features
- Progression: South Branch French Creek → French Creek → Allegheny River → Ohio River → Mississippi River → Gulf of Mexico
- River system: Allegheny River
- Tributaries
  - left: unnamed tributaries
  - right: unnamed tributaries
- Bridges: Tarbell Road, Messenger Road, Turnpike Road, US 6, W Pleasant Street, S Main Street, Elgin Road

Beaver Run is a 9.33 mi (15.02 km) long tributary to South Branch French Creek in Erie County, Pennsylvania and is classed as a 2nd order stream on the EPA waters geoviewer site.

== Course ==
Beaver Run rises in Amity Township of Erie County, Pennsylvania northwest of Beaver Dam and then flows southwest through Wayne Township to meet South Branch French Creek south of Elgin, Pennsylvania.

== Watershed ==
Beaver Run drains 6.87 square miles (17.8 km^{2}) of Erie Drift Plain (glacial geology). The watershed receives an average of 46.7 in/year of precipitation and has a wetness index of 481.88.
