= South Branch French Creek (French Creek tributary) =

Stream in Pennsylvania, USA

South Branch French Creek Tributary to French Creek
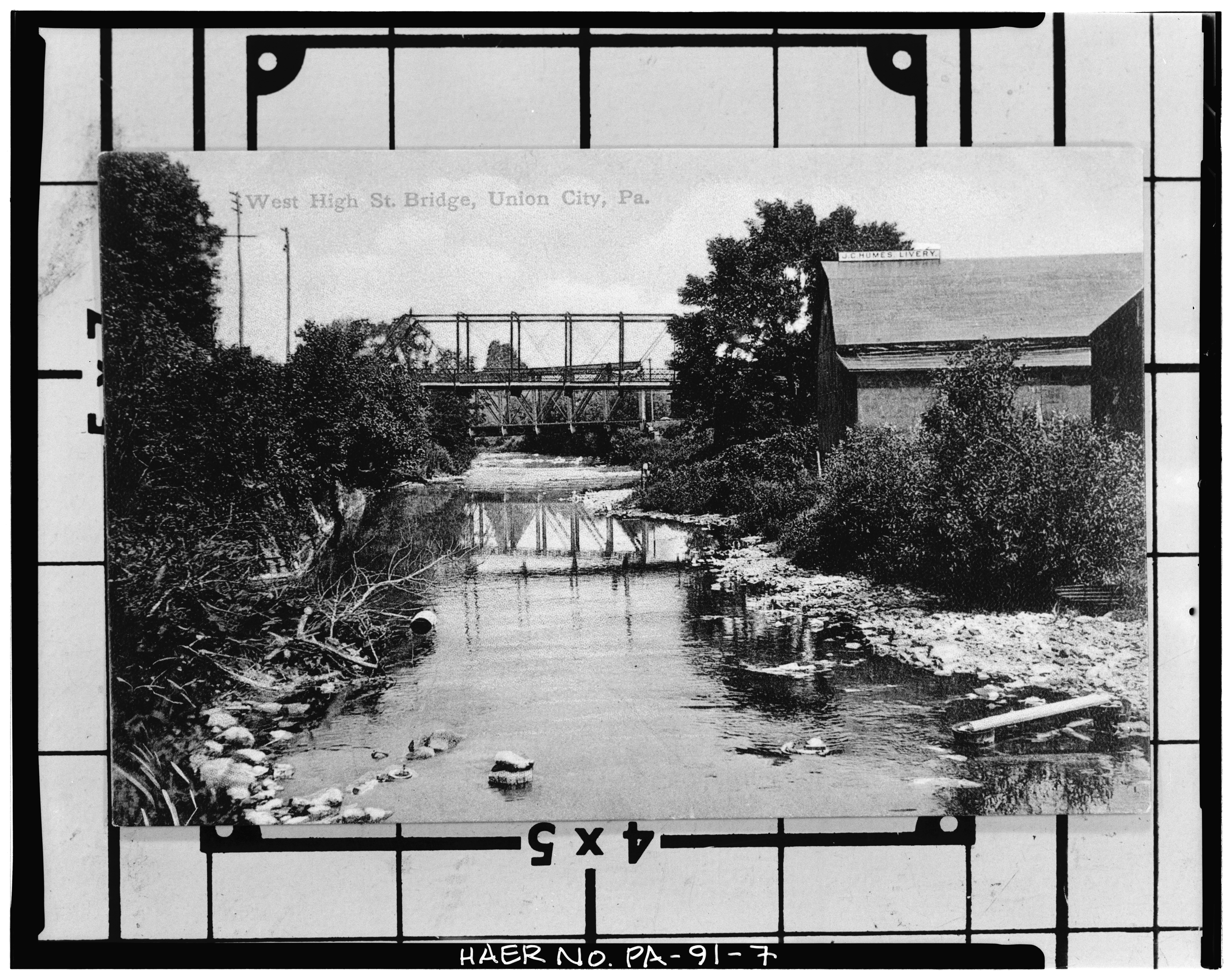
- View of West High Street Bridge over South Branch of French Creek, with Penn Railroad Bridge in background

- Location of the mouth of South Branch French Creek South Branch French Creek (French Creek tributary) (the United States)

Location
- Country: United States
- State: Pennsylvania
- County: Erie

Physical characteristics
- Source: divide between East Branch Oil Creek and Spring Creek
  - location: Southeastern corner of Erie County, about 2 miles northeast of Spartansburg, Pennsylvania
  - coordinates: 41°51′50″N 079°38′42″W
  - elevation: 1,680 ft (510 m)
- Mouth: French Creek
  - location: about 1.5 miles west of Union City, Pennsylvania
  - coordinates: 41°54′10″N 079°54′06″W
  - elevation: 1,200 ft (370 m)
- Length: 24.2 mi (38.9 km)
- Basin size: 81.3 square miles (211 km^{2})
- Discharge
  - location: west of Union City, Pennsylvania
  - average: 151.52 cu ft/s (4.291 m^{3}/s) at mouth with French Creek

Basin features
- Progression: French Creek → Allegheny River → Ohio River → Mississippi River → Gulf of Mexico
- River system: Allegheny River
- Population: 5,059 (2010)
- Tributaries
  - left: Lilley Run; Hungry Run; Horton Run
  - right: Spencer Creek; Baskin Run; Slaughter Run; Beaver Run; Pine Run; Bentley Run

South Branch French Creek is a 24.2-mile (38.9 km) long tributary to French Creek in Erie County, Pennsylvania. It is classed as a 3rd order stream on the EPA waters geoviewer site.

== Course ==
South Branch French Creek rises in Concord Township of southeastern Erie County, Pennsylvania and flows south towards Corry, Pennsylvania then turns west towards Union City, Pennsylvania. Many tributaries feed into it on its way to French Creek west of Union City.

== Watershed ==
South Branch French Creek drains 81.3 square miles of Erie Drift Plain (glacial geology). The watershed receives an average of 47.7 in/year of precipitation and has a wetness index of 457.08.

=== Tributaries ===
Tributaries to South Branch French Creek (French Creek tributary)

Name, Bank	River Mile (km)	Watershed Area in Square Miles (km^{2})	Average Discharge	Mouth Coordinates	Mouth Elevation	Source Coordinates	Source Elevation	Remarks
Mouth		81.3 square miles (211 km^{2})	151.52 cu ft/s (4.291 m^{3}/s)	41°54′10″N 079°54′06″W	1,200 ft (370 m)	41°51′50″N 79°38′42″W	1,680 ft (510 m)	South Branch French Creek rises in Concord Township, Erie County, Pennsylvania and flows through the boroughs of Corry and Union City to join French Creek west of Union City.
Horton Run, left bank	0.88 mi (1.42 km)	3.11 square miles (8.1 km^{2})	6.22 cu ft/s (0.176 m^{3}/s)	41°54′11″N 079°53′13″W	1,204 ft (367 m)	41°51′36″N 079°50′56″W	1,550 ft (470 m)	Horton Run rises about 2.5 miles southeast of Hinkley Corners, Pennsylvania on the divide between it and West Shreve Run (Oil Creek). It then flows northwest to join South Branch French Creek about 1 mile west of Union City, Pennsylvania.
Bentley Run, right bank	4.30 mi (6.92 km)	4.10 square miles (10.6 km^{2})	8.09 cu ft/s (0.229 m^{3}/s)	41°53′50″N 079°50′12″W	1,266 ft (386 m)	41°55′51″N 079°47′39″W	1,520 ft (460 m)	Bentley Run rises just upstream of Union City Reservoir, about 1 mile north of Union City on the divide between it, Alder Run and Pine Run. The stream then flows southwest to meet South Branch French Creek in Union City, Pennsylvania.
Pine Run, right bank	8.96 mi (14.42 km)	2.0 square miles (5.2 km^{2})	5.45 cu ft/s (0.154 m^{3}/s)	41°53′33″N 079°47′07″W	1,309 ft (399 m)	41°56′07″N 079°47′29″W	1,580 ft (480 m)	Pine Run rises on the divide between Bentley Run and Beaver Run, about 2 miles northeast of Union City, Pennsylvania. The stream then flows south to meet South Branch French Creek east of Union City.
Hungry Run, left bank	10.10 mi (16.25 km)	4.47 square miles (11.6 km^{2})	9.00 cu ft/s (0.255 m^{3}/s)	41°53′07″N 079°46′41″W	1,319 ft (402 m)	41°50′36″N 079°46′40″W	1,550 ft (470 m)	Hungry Run rises on the Britton Run divide about 3 northeast of Tillotson, Pennsylvania. The stream then flows north to meet South Branch French Creek about 2 miles southwest of Elgin, Pennsylvania.
Lilley Run, left bank	13.20 mi (21.24 km)	4.77 square miles (12.4 km^{2})	9.73 cu ft/s (0.276 m^{3}/s)	41°53′26″N 079°44′32″W	1,342 ft (409 m)	41°50′55″N 079°43′46″W	1,652 ft (504 m)	Lilley Run rises in a pond on the divide between this stream and Stranahan Run. Lilley Run then flows north to meet South Branch French Creek about 0.5 miles west of Concord, Pennsylvania.
Beaver Run, right bank	13.42 mi (21.60 km)	6.87 square miles (17.8 km^{2})	13.55 cu ft/s (0.384 m^{3}/s)	41°53′27″N 079°44′22″W	1,342 ft (409 m)	41°56′35″N 079°47′25″W	1,505 ft (459 m)	Beaver Run rises about 3 miles northwest of Beaver Dam, Pennsylvania on the Bentley Run divide. The stream then flows south to meet South Branch French Creek about 0.5 miles south of Elgin, Pennsylvania.
Slaughter Run, right bank	15.24 mi (24.53 km)	5.67 square miles (14.7 km^{2})	11.47 cu ft/s (0.325 m^{3}/s)	41°54′06″N 079°43′08″W	1,352 ft (412 m)	41°56′58″N 079°44′28″W	1,790 ft (550 m)	Slaughter Run rises on the Herrick Creek divide about 2 miles northwest of Five Points, Pennsylvania. The stream then flows south to meet South Branch French Creek about 1 mile east of Elgin, Pennsylvania.
Baskin Run, right bank	15.86 mi (25.52 km)	4.86 square miles (12.6 km^{2})	10.21 cu ft/s (0.289 m^{3}/s)	41°54′23″N 079°42′42″W	1,358 ft (414 m)	41°58′48″N 079°43′10″W	1,832 ft (558 m)	Baskin Run rises on the Hare Creek divide about 0.5 miles northwest of Five Points, Pennsylvania. The stream then flows south to meet South Branch French Creek about 0.25 miles west of Lovell, Pennsylvania.
Spencer Creek, right bank	18.52 mi (29.81 km)	3.38 square miles (8.8 km^{2})	7.24 cu ft/s (0.205 m^{3}/s)	41°55′09″N 079°41′00″W	1,371 ft (418 m)	41°58′08″N 079°41′21″W	1,820 ft (550 m)	Spencer Creek rises on the Hare Creek divide about 0.5 miles south of Five Points and then flows south to meet South Branch French Creek about 1.5 miles west of Corry, Pennsylvania.

== See also ==
- List of rivers of Pennsylvania
- List of tributaries of the Allegheny River
