= Slaughter Run (South Branch French Creek tributary) =

Stream in Pennsylvania, USA

Slaughter Run Tributary to South Branch French Creek
- Location of Slaughter Run mouth Slaughter Run (South Branch French Creek tributary) (the United States)

Location
- Country: United States
- State: Pennsylvania
- County: Erie

Physical characteristics
- Source: divide between Slaughter Run and Herrick Creek (French Creek)
  - location: about 2 miles northwest of Five Points, Pennsylvania
  - coordinates: 41°56′58″N 079°44′28″W
  - elevation: 1,790 ft (550 m)
- Mouth: South Branch French Creek
  - location: about 1 mile east of Elgin, Pennsylvania
  - coordinates: 41°54′06″N 079°43′08″W
  - elevation: 1,352 ft (412 m)
- Length: 7.71 mi (12.41 km)
- Basin size: 5.67 square miles (14.7 km^{2})
- Discharge
  - location: South Branch French Creek
  - average: 11.47 cu ft/s (0.325 m^{3}/s) at mouth with South Branch French Creek

Basin features
- Progression: South Branch French Creek → French Creek → Allegheny River → Ohio River → Mississippi River → Gulf of Mexico
- River system: Allegheny River
- Tributaries
  - left: unnamed tributaries
  - right: unnamed tributaries
- Bridges: Carter Hill Road, Follett Road, Proctor Road, Turnpike Road, US 6, Lovell Road

Slaughter Run is a 5.67 mi (9.12 km) long tributary to South Branch French Creek in Erie County, Pennsylvania and is classed as a 1st order stream on the EPA waters geoviewer site.

== Course ==
Slaughter Run rises in Wayne Township of Erie County, Pennsylvania northwest of Five Points and then flows south to meet South Branch French Creek west of Lovell, Pennsylvania.

== Watershed ==
Slaughter Run drains 5.67 square miles (14.7 km^{2}) of Erie Drift Plain (glacial geology). The watershed receives an average of 47.1 in/year of precipitation and has a wetness index of 452.75.
