= Hungry Run (South Branch French Creek tributary) =

Stream in Pennsylvania, US

Hungry Run Tributary to South Branch French Creek
- Location of Hungry Run mouth Hungry Run (South Branch French Creek tributary) (the United States)

Location
- Country: United States
- State: Pennsylvania
- Counties: Erie; Crawford

Physical characteristics
- Source: divide between Hungry Run and Britton Run (Oil Creek)
  - location: about 3 miles northeast of Tillotson, Pennsylvania
  - coordinates: 41°50′36″N 079°46′40″W
  - elevation: 1,645 ft (501 m)
- Mouth: South Branch French Creek
  - location: about 2 miles southwest of Elgin, Pennsylvania
  - coordinates: 41°53′07″N 079°46′41″W
  - elevation: 1,319 ft (402 m)
- Length: 3.49 mi (5.62 km)
- Basin size: 4.47 square miles (11.6 km^{2})
- Discharge
  - location: South Branch French Creek
  - average: 9.00 cu ft/s (0.255 m^{3}/s) at mouth with South Branch French Creek

Basin features
- Progression: South Branch French Creek → French Creek → Allegheny River → Ohio River → Mississippi River → Gulf of Mexico
- River system: Allegheny River
- Tributaries
  - left: unnamed tributaries
  - right: unnamed tributaries
- Bridges: Hungry Run Road (x2), Concord Road

Hungry Run is a 3.49 mi (5.62 km) long tributary to South Branch French Creek in Erie County, Pennsylvania, and is classed as a 2nd order stream on the EPA waters geoviewer site.

== Course ==
Hungry Run rises in Bloomfield Township of northern Crawford County and then flows north into Erie County through Union Township where it meets South Branch French Creek.

== Watershed ==
Hungry Run drains 4.47 square miles (11.6 km^{2}) of Erie Drift Plain (glacial geology). The watershed receives an average of 46.6 in/year of precipitation and has a wetness index of 469.09.

== Additional images ==
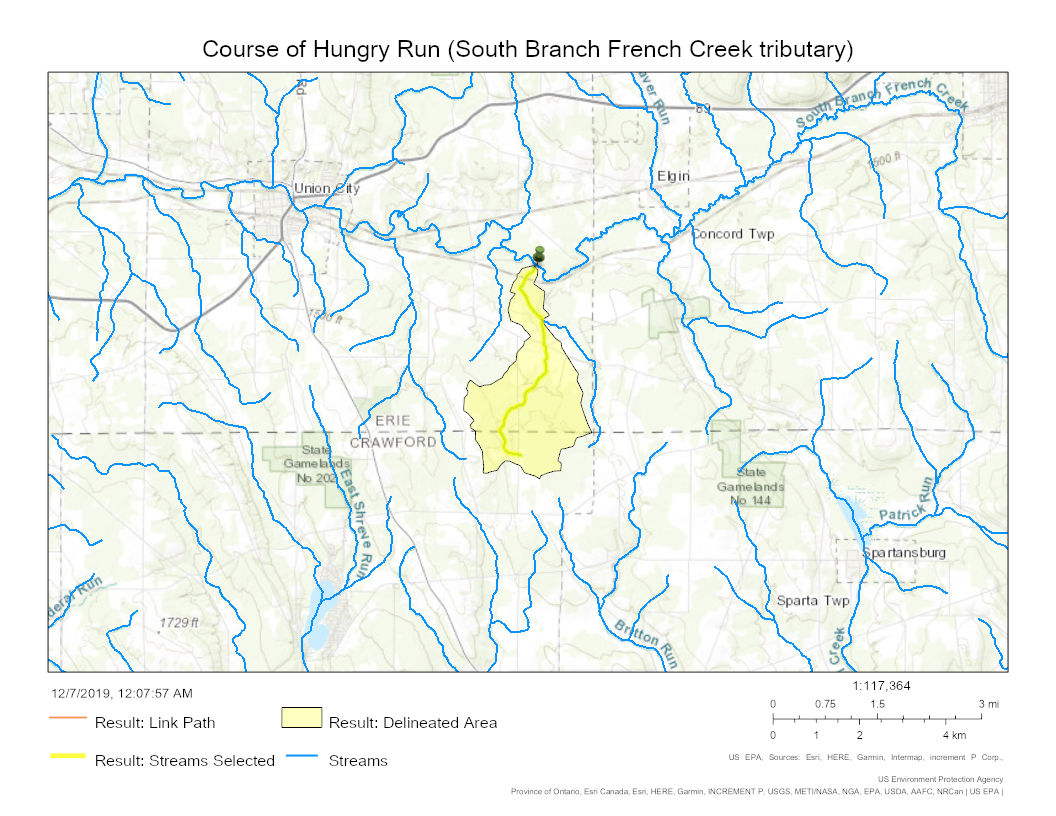
Course of Hungry Run (South Branch French Creek tributary)

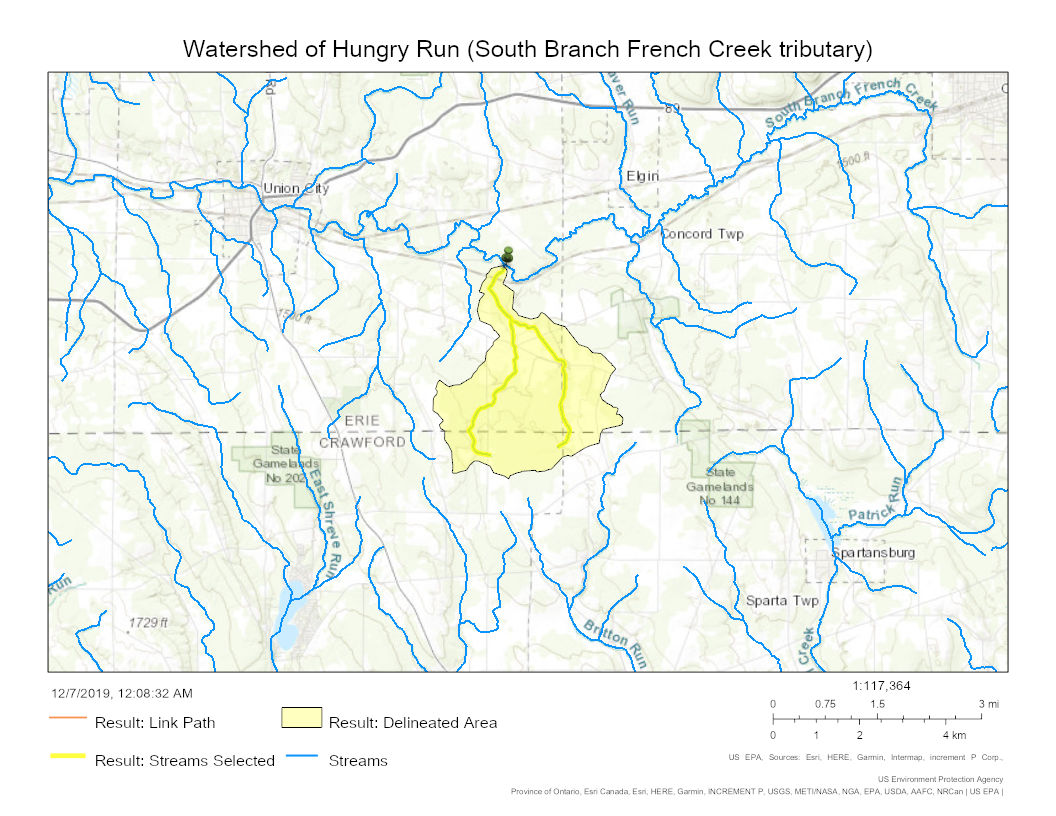
Watershed of Hungry Run (South Branch French Creek tributary)
