= Union City Historic District =

Historic district in Pennsylvania, United States

- U.S. National Register of Historic Places
- U.S. Historic district
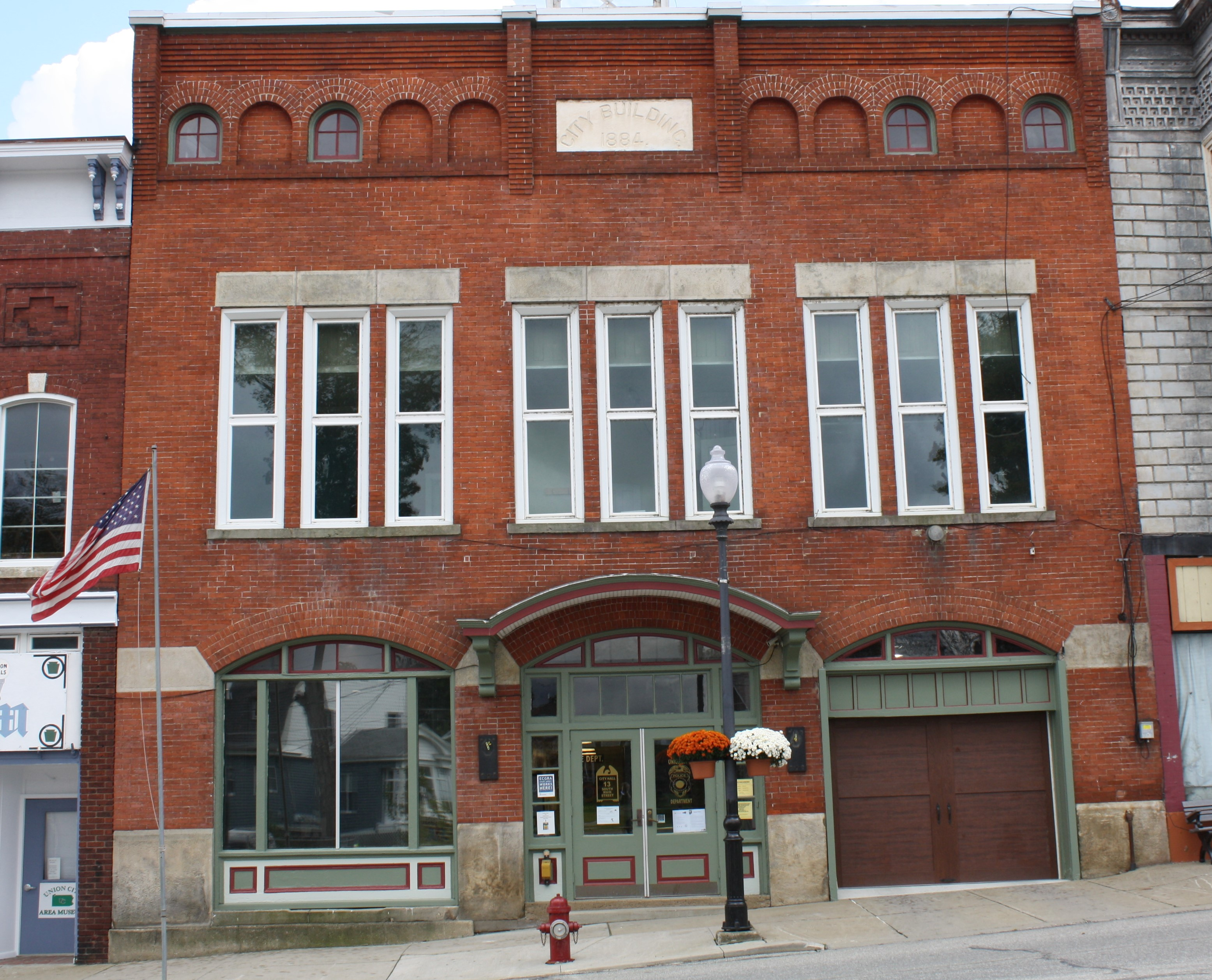
- Union City, Pennsylvania City Building in Historic District

- Location within Pennsylvania Location within the United States
- Location: Roughly bounded by Third, High, Main, and South Sts., Union City, Pennsylvania
- Coordinates: 41°53′52″N 79°50′52″W
- Area: 33.8 acres (13.7 ha)
- Architect: Multiple
- Architectural style: Colonial Revival, Late Victorian
- NRHP reference No.: 90000417
- Added to NRHP: March 9, 1990

The Union City Historic District is a national historic district that is located in Union City, Erie County, Pennsylvania.

It was added to the National Register of Historic Places in 1990.

== History and architectural features ==
This district encompasses ninety-six contributing buildings and one contributing structure that are located in the central business district and surrounding residential areas of Union City. The district includes commercial, residential, and industrial buildings that were built between 1865 and 1925 and designed in a variety of popular architectural styles, including Late Victorian and Colonial Revival. The commercial buildings are mostly brick two- and three-story buildings. Notable buildings include the Hansen Building (1888), the Clement Lodge Building (1890), the I.O.O.F. Building (1889), the Union City Chair Company building (1907, 1911), the Mulkie House (c. 1905), the Westcott House (c. 1900), and the First Baptist Church (1923).
