= Baskin Run =

Stream in Pennsylvania, USA

Baskin Run Tributary to South Branch French Creek
- Location of Baskin Run mouth Baskin Run (the United States)

Location
- Country: United States
- State: Pennsylvania
- County: Erie

Physical characteristics
- Source: divide between Baskin Run and Hare Creek (Brokenstraw Creek)
  - location: About 0.5 miles northwest of Five Points, Pennsylvania
  - coordinates: 41°58′48″N 079°43′10″W
  - elevation: 1,832 ft (558 m)
- Mouth: South Branch French Creek
  - location: about 0.25 miles west of Lovell, Pennsylvania
  - coordinates: 41°54′23″N 079°42′42″W
  - elevation: 1,358 ft (414 m)
- Length: 5.52 mi (8.88 km)
- Basin size: 4.86 square miles (12.6 km^{2})
- Discharge
  - location: South Branch French Creek
  - average: 10.21 cu ft/s (0.289 m^{3}/s) at mouth with South Branch French Creek

Basin features
- Progression: South Branch French Creek → French Creek → Allegheny River → Ohio River → Mississippi River → Gulf of Mexico
- River system: Allegheny River
- Tributaries
  - left: unnamed tributaries
  - right: unnamed tributaries
- Bridges: Follett Road, Thompson Road, Turnpike Road, US 6

Baskin Run is a 4.86 mi (7.82 km) long tributary to South Branch French Creek in Erie County, Pennsylvania and is classed as a 1st order stream on the EPA waters geoviewer site.

== Course ==
Baskin Run rises in Wayne Township of Erie County, Pennsylvania then flows south to meet South Branch French Creek west of Lovell, Pennsylvania.

== Watershed ==
Baskin Run drains 4.86 square miles (12.6 km^{2}) of Erie Drift Plain (glacial geology). The watershed receives an average of 47.4 in/year of precipitation and has a wetness index of 427.64.
