= Corry Armory =

- U.S. National Register of Historic Places
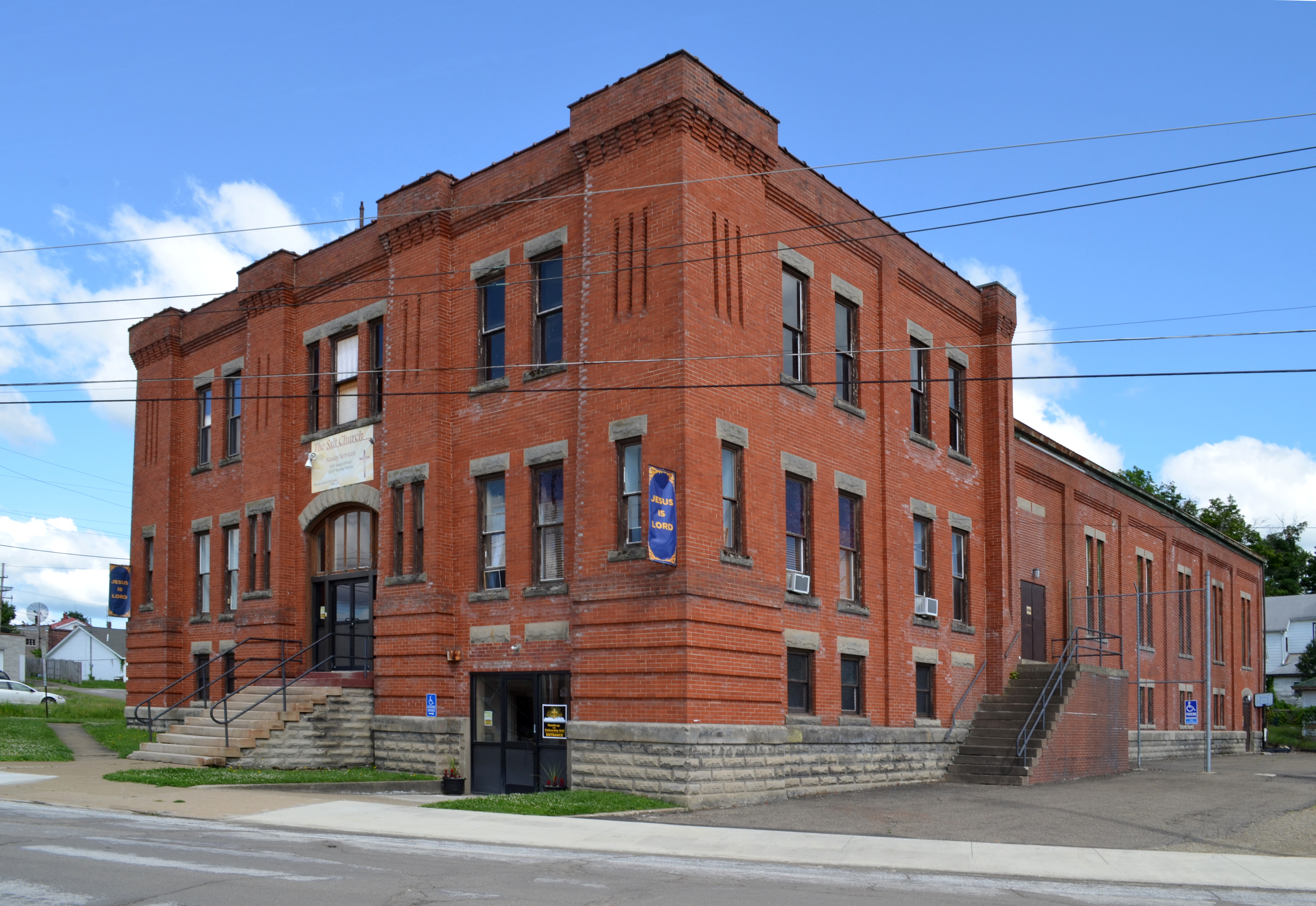

- Location within Pennsylvania Location within the United States
- Location: 205 E. Washington St., Corry, Pennsylvania
- Coordinates: 41°55′22″N 79°38′21″W
- Area: 0.4 acres (0.16 ha)
- Built: 1906
- Built by: Thomas, G.,& Sons
- Architect: Mount, A.P.,& Son
- Architectural style: Romanesque
- MPS: Pennsylvania National Guard Armories MPS
- NRHP reference No.: 91000509
- Added to NRHP: May 9, 1991

Corry Armory is a historic National Guard armory located at Corry, Erie County, Pennsylvania. It was built in 1906, and is a T-shaped brick building in the Romanesque style. It consists of a three-story, flat roofed administration building, with an attached two-story, gambrel roofed drill hall. It sits on a stone foundation and features brick buttresses with corbeled cornices, slightly raised parapets, and entrance with segmented stone arch.

It was added to the National Register of Historic Places in 1991.
