= Charles F. Ritchel =

American inventor (1844–1911)

Charles Frances Ritchel
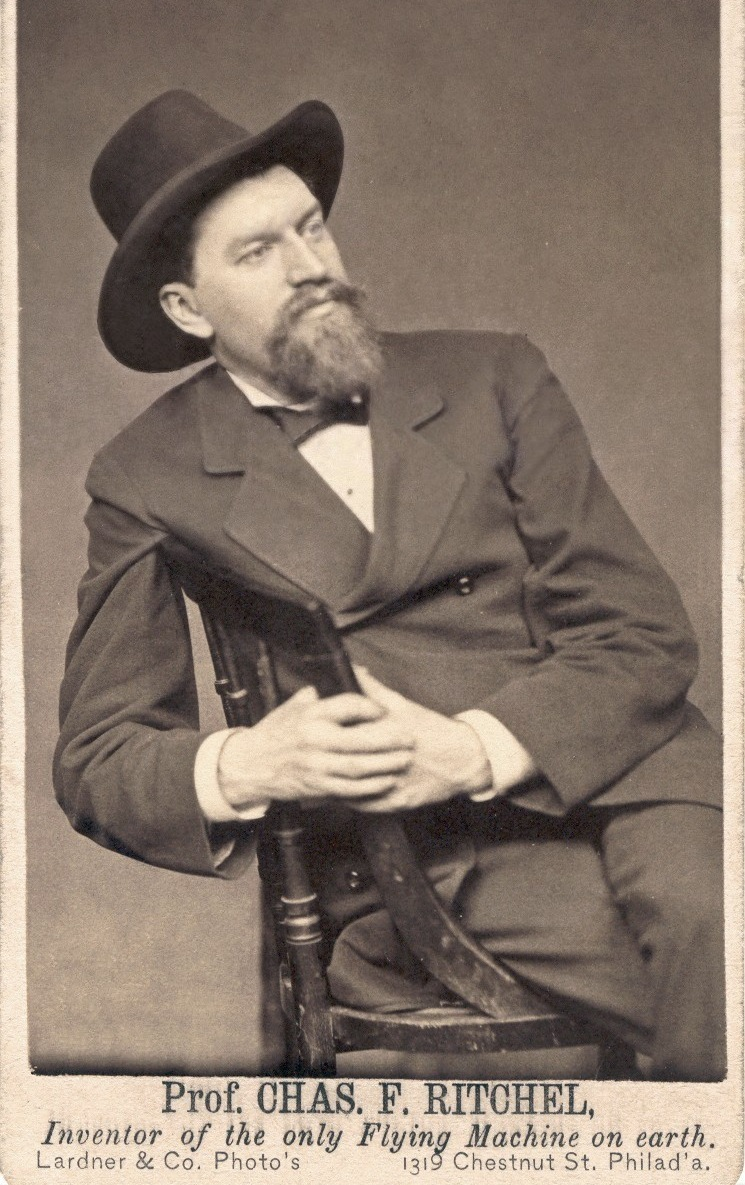
- Born: December 22, 1844; Portland, Maine
- Died: January 21, 1911 (aged 66); Bridgeport, Connecticut
- Spouse: Harriet Norman

Charles Frances Ritchel (December 22, 1844 – January 21, 1911) was an American inventor of a successful dirigible design, the fun house mirror, a mechanical toy bank, and the holder of more than 150 other patented inventions.

== Biography ==
Charles Frances Ritchel was born on December 22, 1844, in Portland, Maine. He died in Bridgeport, Connecticut, on January 21, 1911.

== Dirigible ==
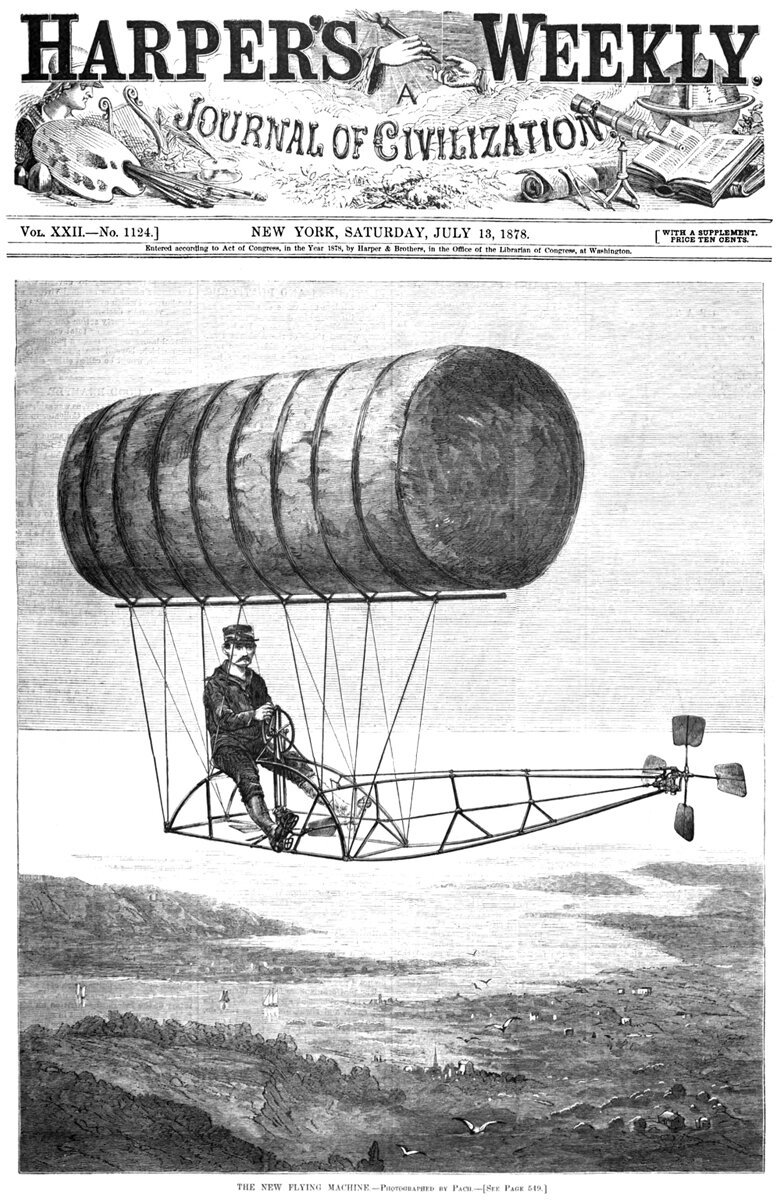
Ritchel's dirigible, as seen on the July 15, 1878 cover of 'Harper's Weekly

Ritchel's design patent for a "Flying-Machine"

Ritchel designed and built a small, one-man dirigible powered by a hand crank. He patented his "Improved Flying Machine" on 12 March 1878 (Patent No. 201200). The aircraft consisted of a brass frame put together at Folansbee Machine Shop in Bridgeport, Connecticut. The frame was hung beneath a cylindrical, rubber gas bag manufactured by the Goodyear Tire and Rubber Company in Naugatuck. A small propeller drove the craft and could be moved left and right for turning. The craft could reach a height of 200 feet (61 m).

At the 1876 Centennial Exposition in Philadelphia, Ritchel flew the craft within one of the large exhibition halls. Two years later, on June 12, 1878, the craft set off from a baseball field behind the Colt Armory in Hartford, Connecticut. Before a large group of spectators, Mark W. Quindlen flew the machine over the armory building and the Connecticut River before returning to the starting point and landing.

"This was the first flight of a man-carrying dirigible in America," according to Harvey Lippincott, founder of the Connecticut Aeronautical Historical Association.

On the following day, Quindlen again ascended, but the wind proved to be too strong and he was blown off course, landing in nearby Newington, Connecticut. More flights took place in Boston and elsewhere, and eventually five of the aircraft were constructed and sold. Ritchel imagined a transcontinental airline with larger dirigibles cranked by 11 men.

== Other inventions ==
Today the most well-known of Ritchel's inventions is the funhouse mirror, originally dubbed by the inventor as "Ritchel's Laugh-O-Graphs." The curved and specially shaped mirrors reflect amusing, distorted images of anyone standing in front of them.

Some credit Ritchel with inventing rollerskates. He did invent a toy bank in the shape of a monkey (patented November 7, 1882, Design Patent No. 13,400).

A coin is put on a tray held in the monkey's upturned palms. A lever in the back is pressed. The arms rise, tilting the coin toward a slot in the monkey's belly. Ives Manufacturing in Bridgeport may have produced the bank.

== Life ==
In a patent application for his dirigible, Ritchel said he was a resident of Corry, Pennsylvania.

Despite his many inventions, Ritchel died destitute in his hometown of Bridgeport, Connecticut.
