= Lilley Run =

Stream in Pennsylvania, USA

Lilley Run Tributary to South Branch French Creek
- Location of Lilley Run mouth Lilley Run (the United States)

Location
- Country: United States
- State: Pennsylvania
- Counties: Erie; Crawford

Physical characteristics
- Source: divide between Lilley Run and Stranahan Run
  - location: pond about 1 mile west-southwest of Concord Corners, Pennsylvania
  - coordinates: 41°50′55″N 079°43′46″W
  - elevation: 1,652 ft (504 m)
- Mouth: South Branch French Creek
  - location: about 0.5 miles west of Concord, Pennsylvania
  - coordinates: 41°53′26″N 079°44′32″W
  - elevation: 1,342 ft (409 m)
- Length: 3.66 mi (5.89 km)
- Basin size: 4.77 square miles (12.4 km^{2})
- Discharge
  - location: South Branch French Creek
  - average: 9.73 cu ft/s (0.276 m^{3}/s) at mouth with South Branch French Creek

Basin features
- Progression: South Branch French Creek → French Creek → Allegheny River → Ohio River → Mississippi River → Gulf of Mexico
- River system: Allegheny River
- Tributaries
  - left: unnamed tributaries
  - right: unnamed tributaries
- Bridges: Concord Road, Ormsbee Road, Mitchell Road

Lilley Run is a 3.66 mi (5.89 km) long 2nd order tributary to South Branch French Creek in Erie County, Pennsylvania.

== Course ==
Lilley Run rises in Sparta Township, Crawford County, Pennsylvania, north of Crawford County and then flows north into Erie County through Concord Township where it meets South Branch French Creek.

== Watershed ==
Lilley Run drains 4.77 square miles (12.4 km^{2}) of Erie Drift Plain (glacial geology). The watershed receives an average of 46.8 in/year of precipitation and has a wetness index of 453.45.

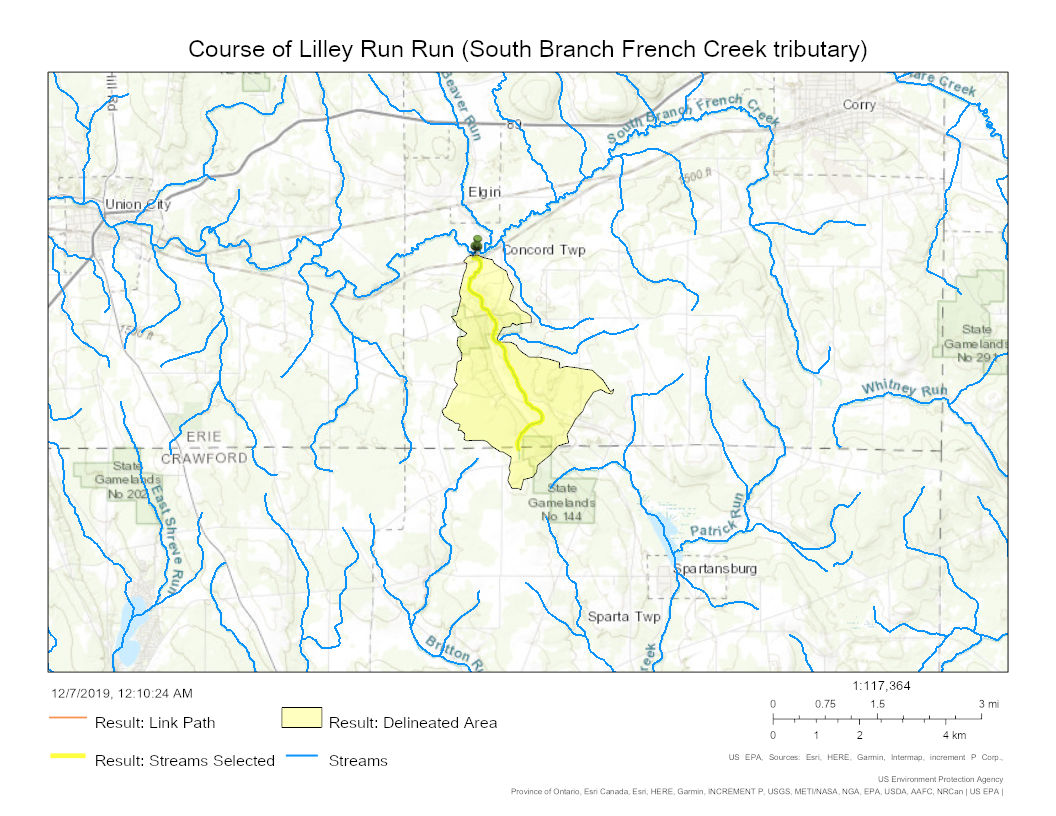
Course of Lilley Run (South Branch French Creek tributary)

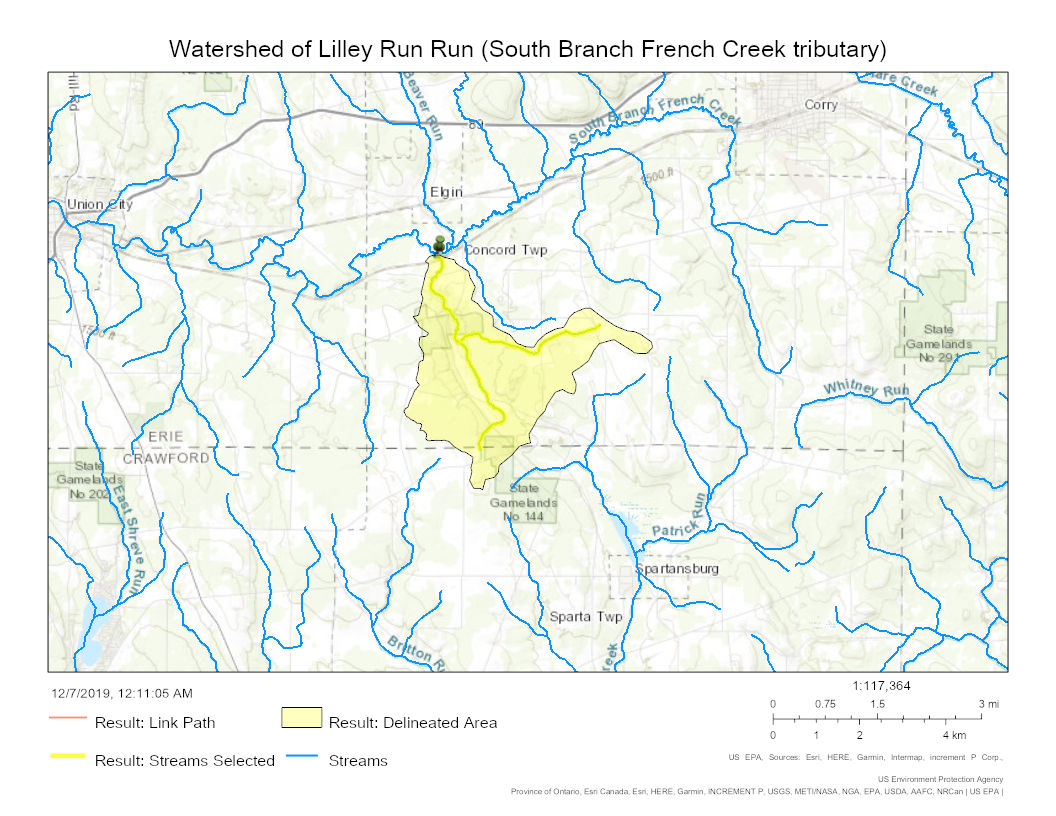
Watershed of Lilley Run (South Branch French Creek tributary)
