= Elgin, Pennsylvania =

Borough in Pennsylvania, US

- Borough
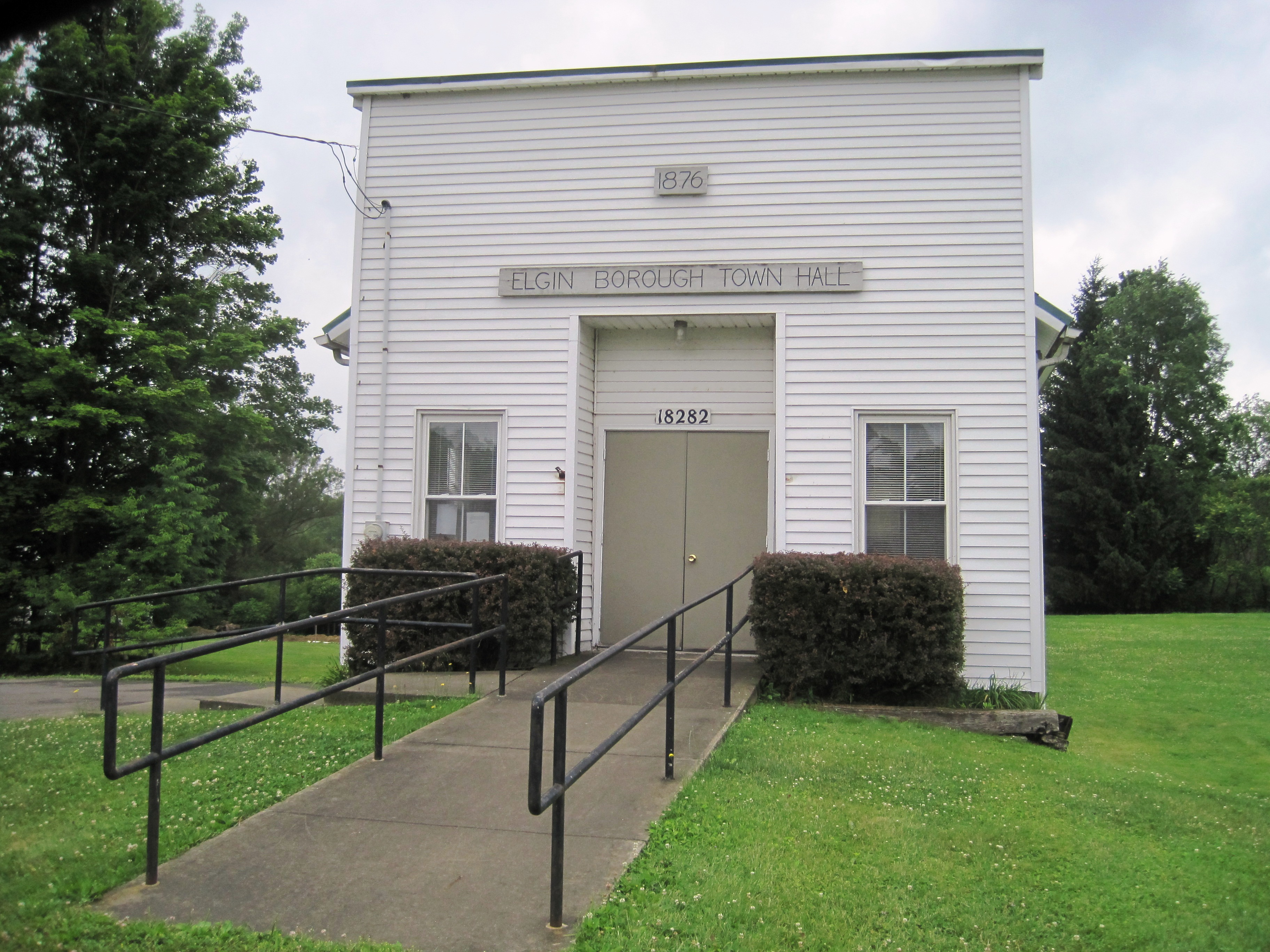
- Town hall

- Location in Erie County and the U.S. state of Pennsylvania.
- Coordinates: 41°54′7″N 79°44′41″W
- Country: United States
- State: Pennsylvania
- County: Erie

Government
  - Mayor: Richard W. Patterson

Area
  - Total: 1.47 sq mi (3.82 km^{2})
  - Land: 1.47 sq mi (3.82 km^{2})
  - Water: 0 sq mi (0.00 km^{2})
- Elevation (center of borough): 1,388 ft (423 m)
- Highest elevation (western borough boundary): 1,520 ft (460 m)
- Lowest elevation (Beaver Creek): 1,360 ft (410 m)

Population (2020)
  - Total: 204
  - Density: 138.4/sq mi (53.45/km^{2})
- Time zone: UTC-4 (EST)
  - Summer (DST): UTC-5 (EDT)
- ZIP code: 16407
- Area code: 814
- FIPS code: 42-22960

Elgin is a borough in Erie County, Pennsylvania, United States. The population was 204 at the 2020 census. It is part of the Erie Metropolitan Statistical Area. Places of recreation include Elgin Community Park. Elgin is home to the oldest borough building in Erie County.

The community most likely was named after Elgin, Scotland.

== Geography ==
Elgin is located in southeastern Erie County at 41°54′7″N 79°44′41″W (41.902058, -79.744851). It is bordered to the west by Union Township, to the north by Wayne Township, and to the northwest, east and south by Concord Township.

According to the United States Census Bureau, the borough has a total area of 1.5 square miles (3.8 km^{2}), all land.

U.S. Route 6 runs along the northern border of the borough, leading east 5.5 miles (8.9 km) to Corry and west 5.7 miles (9.2 km) to Union City. Pennsylvania Route 89 leads northwest from US 6 7.5 miles (12.1 km) to Wattsburg. Erie is 26 miles (42 km) to the northwest via PA 89 and PA 8.

Beaver Run, a tributary of South Branch French Creek flows through the middle of the borough.

== Demographics ==
Historical population
Census	Pop.	Note	%±
1880	154		—
1890	169		9.7%
1900	138		−18.3%
1910	148		7.2%
1920	179		20.9%
1930	172		−3.9%
1940	224		30.2%
1950	202		−9.8%
1960	218		7.9%
1970	173		−20.6%
1980	235		35.8%
1990	229		−2.6%
2000	236		3.1%
2010	218		−7.6%
2020	204		−6.4%
2021 (est.)	203	▼	−0.5%

As of the census of 2000, there were 236 people, 84 households, and 69 families residing in the borough. The population density was 150.9 inhabitants per square mile (58.3/km^{2}). There were 88 housing units at an average density of 56.3 per square mile (21.7/km^{2}). The racial makeup of the borough was 99.58% White, and 0.42% from two or more races. Hispanic or Latino of any race were 0.85% of the population.

There were 84 households, out of which 32.1% had children under the age of 18 living with them, 70.2% were married couples living together, 8.3% had a female householder with no husband present, and 16.7% were non-families. 14.3% of all households were made up of individuals, and 4.8% had someone living alone who was 65 years of age or older. The average household size was 2.81 and the average family size was 3.04.

In the borough the population was spread out, with 26.3% under the age of 18, 5.5% from 18 to 24, 27.5% from 25 to 44, 24.2% from 45 to 64, and 16.5% who were 65 years of age or older. The median age was 37 years. For every 100 females there were 96.7 males. For every 100 females age 18 and over, there were 89.1 males.

The median income for a household in the borough was $37,083, and the median income for a family was $41,875. Males had a median income of $24,583 versus $17,361 for females. The per capita income for the borough was $15,611. About 9.6% of families and 9.9% of the population were below the poverty line, including 18.0% of those under the age of eighteen and 12.3% of those sixty five or over.

== Education ==
It is in the Corry Area School District.
