= Union Township, Erie County, Pennsylvania =

Township in Pennsylvania, US

Coordinates: 41°52′00″N 79°47′59″W

Union Township
- Township
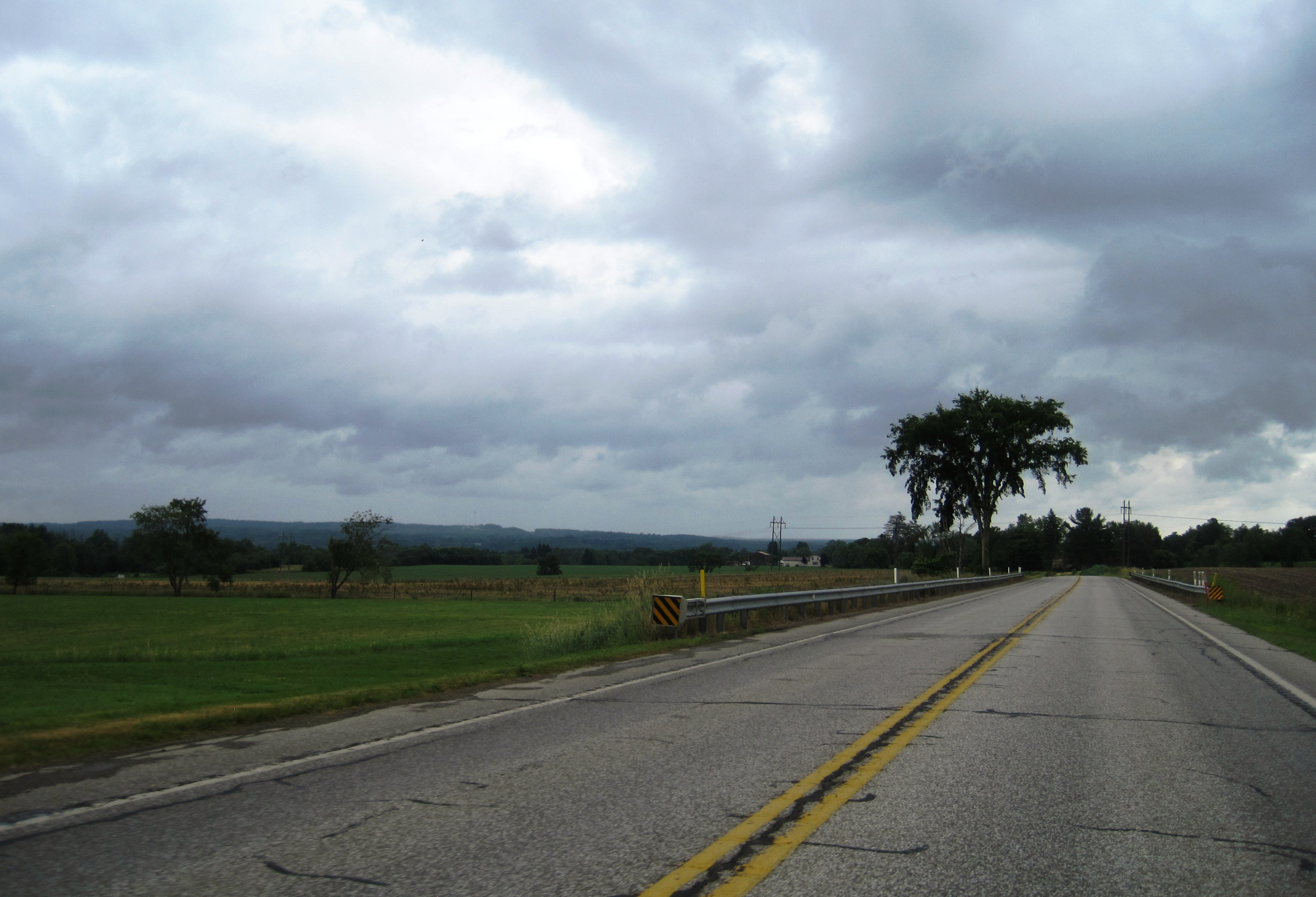
- US 6 eastbound in Union Township

- Location in Erie County and the U.S. state of Pennsylvania
- Country: United States
- State: Pennsylvania
- County: Erie

Area
  - Total: 36.64 sq mi (94.91 km^{2})
  - Land: 36.47 sq mi (94.45 km^{2})
  - Water: 0.18 sq mi (0.47 km^{2})

Population (2020)
  - Total: 1,542
  - Estimate (2023): 1,543
  - Density: 44.4/sq mi (17.13/km^{2})
- Time zone: UTC-4 (EST)
  - Summer (DST): UTC-5 (EDT)
- Area code: 814
- FIPS code: 42-049-78312

Union Township is a township in Erie County, Pennsylvania, United States. The population was 1,542 at the 2020 census, down from 1,655 at the 2010 census.

== Geography ==
The township is in southeastern Erie County, bordered to the south by Crawford County. The township surrounds the borough of Union City, a separate municipality.

According to the United States Census Bureau, the township has a total area of 36.6 square miles (94.9 km^{2}), of which 36.4 square miles (94.4 km^{2}) is land and 0.2 square miles (0.5 km^{2}), or 0.49%, is water. The South Branch of French Creek flows from east to west across the center of the township and is the main drainage. Tributaries to South Branch French Creek in Union Township include Bentley Run, Hungry Run, Horton Run, and Pine Run. A small section in the southwestern part of the township is drained by East Shreve Run, a tributary of Oil Creek.

== Demographics ==
Historical population
| Census | Pop. | Note | %± |
|---|---|---|---|
| 2000 | 1,663 | | — |
| 2010 | 1,655 | | −0.5% |
| 2020 | 1,542 | | −6.8% |
| 2023 (est.) | 1,543 | | 0.1% |
U.S. Decennial Census

As of the census of 2000, there were 1,663 people, 598 households, and 490 families residing in the township. The population density was 45.6 inhabitants per square mile (17.6/km^{2}). There were 631 housing units at an average density of 17.3/sq mi (6.7/km^{2}). The racial makeup of the township was 99.76% White, 0.06% African American, 0.06% from other races, and 0.12% from two or more races. Hispanic or Latino of any race were 0.12% of the population.

There were 598 households, out of which 32.6% had children under the age of 18 living with them, 69.4% were married couples living together, 7.4% had a female householder with no husband present, and 17.9% were non-families. 15.2% of all households were made up of individuals, and 8.0% had someone living alone who was 65 years of age or older. The average household size was 2.77 and the average family size was 3.06.

In the township the population was spread out, with 24.1% under the age of 18, 7.3% from 18 to 24, 25.9% from 25 to 44, 28.1% from 45 to 64, and 14.6% who were 65 years of age or older. The median age was 41 years. For every 100 females, there were 106.1 males. For every 100 females age 18 and over, there were 105.2 males.

The median income for a household in the township was $40,852, and the median income for a family was $43,563. Males had a median income of $31,346 versus $22,500 for females. The per capita income for the township was $18,488. About 4.8% of families and 8.1% of the population were below the poverty line, including 13.2% of those under age 18 and 7.1% of those age 65 or over.
