= Spencer Creek (South Branch French Creek tributary) =

Stream in Pennsylvania, USA

Spencer Creek Tributary to South Branch French Creek
- Location of Spencer Creek mouth Spencer Creek (South Branch French Creek tributary) (the United States)

Location
- Country: United States
- State: Pennsylvania
- County: Erie

Physical characteristics
- Source: divide between Spencer Creek and Hare Creek (Brokenstraw Creek)
  - location: About 0.5 miles south of Five Points, Pennsylvania
  - coordinates: 41°58′08″N 079°41′21″W
  - elevation: 1,820 ft (550 m)
- Mouth: South Branch French Creek
  - location: about 1.5 miles west of Corry, Pennsylvania
  - coordinates: 41°55′09″N 079°41′00″W
  - elevation: 1,371 ft (418 m)
- Length: 3.68 mi (5.92 km)
- Basin size: 3.38 square miles (8.8 km^{2})
- Discharge
  - location: South Branch French Creek
  - average: 7.24 cu ft/s (0.205 m^{3}/s) at mouth with South Branch French Creek

Basin features
- Progression: South Branch French Creek → French Creek → Allegheny River → Ohio River → Mississippi River → Gulf of Mexico
- River system: Allegheny River
- Tributaries
  - left: unnamed tributaries
  - right: unnamed tributaries
- Bridges: Carter Hill Road, Turnpike Road, US 6, Conelway Road

Spencer Creek is a 3.68 mi (5.92 km) long tributary to South Branch French Creek in Erie County, Pennsylvania and is classed as a 1st order stream on the EPA waters geoviewer site.

== Course ==
Spencer Creek rises in Wayne Township of Erie County, Pennsylvania then flows south to meet South Branch French Creek west of Corry, Pennsylvania.

== Watershed ==
Spencer Creek drains 3.38 square miles (8.8 km^{2}) of Erie Drift Plain (glacial geology). The watershed receives an average of 47.5 in/year of precipitation and has a wetness index of 416.89.
