= Horton Run (South Branch French Creek tributary) =

Stream in Pennsylvania, USA

Horton Run Tributary to South Branch French Creek
- Location of Horton Run mouth Horton Run (South Branch French Creek tributary) (the United States)

Location
- Country: United States
- State: Pennsylvania
- County: Erie

Physical characteristics
- Source: divide between Horton Run and West Shreve Run (Oil Creek)
  - location: about 2.5 miles southeast of Hinkley Corners, Pennsylvania
  - coordinates: 41°51′36″N 079°50′56″W
  - elevation: 1,550 ft (470 m)
- Mouth: South Branch French Creek
  - location: about 1 mile west of Union City at the Concord-LeBeouf Township line
  - coordinates: 41°54′11″N 079°53′13″W
  - elevation: 1,204 ft (367 m)
- Length: 4.36 mi (7.02 km)
- Basin size: 3.11 square miles (8.1 km^{2})
- Discharge
  - location: South Branch French Creek
  - average: 6.22 cu ft/s (0.176 m^{3}/s) at mouth with South Branch French Creek

Basin features
- Progression: South Branch French Creek → French Creek → Allegheny River → Ohio River → Mississippi River → Gulf of Mexico
- River system: Allegheny River
- Tributaries
  - left: unnamed tributaries
  - right: unnamed tributaries
- Bridges: Shreve Road, US 6, Clemens Road

Horton Run is a 4.36 mi (7.02 km) long tributary to South Branch French Creek in Erie County, Pennsylvania and is classed as a 1st order stream on the EPA waters geoviewer site.

== Variant names ==
According to the Geographic Names Information System, it has also been known historically as:

- Shreves Run

== Course ==
Horton Run rises in southern Union Township of Erie County, Pennsylvania and then flows northwest to join South Branch French Creek.

== Watershed ==
Horton Run drains 3.11 square miles (8.1 km^{2}) of Erie Drift Plain (glacial geology). The watershed receives an average of 46.3 in/year of precipitation and has a wetness index of 468.45.
