= Wayne Township, Erie County, Pennsylvania =

Township in Pennsylvania, US

Coordinates: 41°59′00″N 79°42′59″W

Wayne Township
- Township
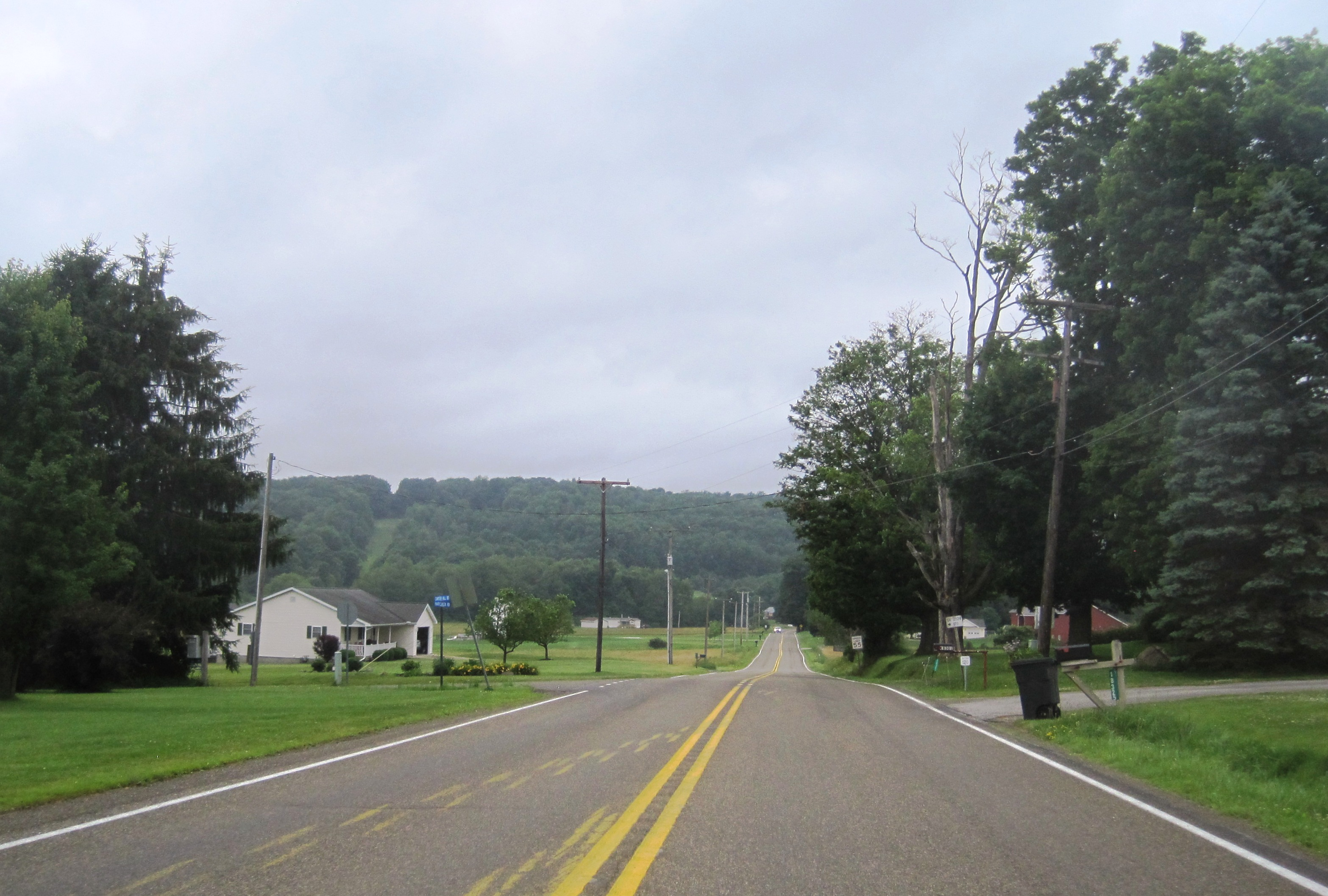
- Northbound PA 426 in Wayne Township
- Etymology: General Anthony Wayne
- Location of Wayne Township in Erie County, Pennsylvania (top) and of Erie County in Pennsylvania (below)
- Country: United States
- State: Pennsylvania
- County: Erie
- Established: 1826

Area
  - Total: 38.15 sq mi (98.80 km^{2})
  - Land: 38.07 sq mi (98.60 km^{2})
  - Water: 0.077 sq mi (0.20 km^{2})

Population (2020)
  - Total: 1,539
  - Estimate (2023): 1,506
  - Density: 42.2/sq mi (16.28/km^{2})
- Time zone: UTC-4 (EST)
  - Summer (DST): UTC-5 (EDT)
- Area code: 814
- FIPS code: 42-049-81760
- Website: www.waynetownshippa.com

Wayne Township is a township in Erie County, Pennsylvania, United States. The population of Wayne Township was 1,539 at the 2020 census, down from 1,659 at the 2010 census, down from 1,766 in 2000.

== Geography ==
The township is in eastern Erie County, bordered to the north by Chautauqua County, New York, and to the east by Warren County. The city of Corry and borough of Elgin are along parts of the township's southern border.

According to the United States Census Bureau, the township has a total area of 38.1 square miles (98.8 km^{2}), of which 38.1 square miles (98.6 km^{2}) is land and 0.1 square miles (0.2 km^{2}), or 0.20%, is water.

The western part of the township is drained by tributaries of South Branch French Creek including Baskin Run, Beaver Run, Slaughter Run, and Spencer Creek. The eastern part of the township is drained by Brokenstraw Creek and its tributaries, Bear Creek and Hare Creek.

== Demographics ==
Historical population
Census	Pop.	Note	%±
2000	1,766		—
2010	1,659		−6.1%
2020	1,539		−7.2%
2023 (est.)	1,506		−2.1%
U.S. Decennial Census

As of the census of 2000, there were 1,766 people, 642 households, and 518 families residing in the township. The population density was 46.1 inhabitants per square mile (17.8/km^{2}). There were 681 housing units at an average density of 17.8/sq mi (6.9/km^{2}). The racial makeup of the township was 98.36% White, 0.28% Native American, 0.34% Asian, 0.06% from other races, and 0.96% from two or more races. Hispanic or Latino of any race were 0.06% of the population.

There were 642 households, out of which 34.6% had children under the age of 18 living with them, 68.7% were married couples living together, 6.4% had a female householder with no husband present, and 19.3% were non-families. 16.2% of all households were made up of individuals, and 8.4% had someone living alone who was 65 years of age or older. The average household size was 2.74 and the average family size was 3.06.

In the township, the population was spread out, with 26.3% under the age of 18, 7.2% from 18 to 24, 27.5% from 25 to 44, 25.7% from 45 to 64, and 13.3% who were 65 years of age or older. The median age was 39 years. For every 100 females, there were 99.8 males. For every 100 females age 18 and over, there were 97.7 males.

The median income for a household in the township was $38,859, and the median income for a family was $42,589. Males had a median income of $32,159 versus $22,621 for females. The per capita income for the township was $16,398. About 6.7% of families and 8.2% of the population were below the poverty line, including 9.5% of those under age 18 and 6.8% of those age 65 or over.
