= Concord Township, Erie County, Pennsylvania =

Township in Pennsylvania, US

Coordinates: 41°52′00″N 79°45′29″W

Concord Township
- Township
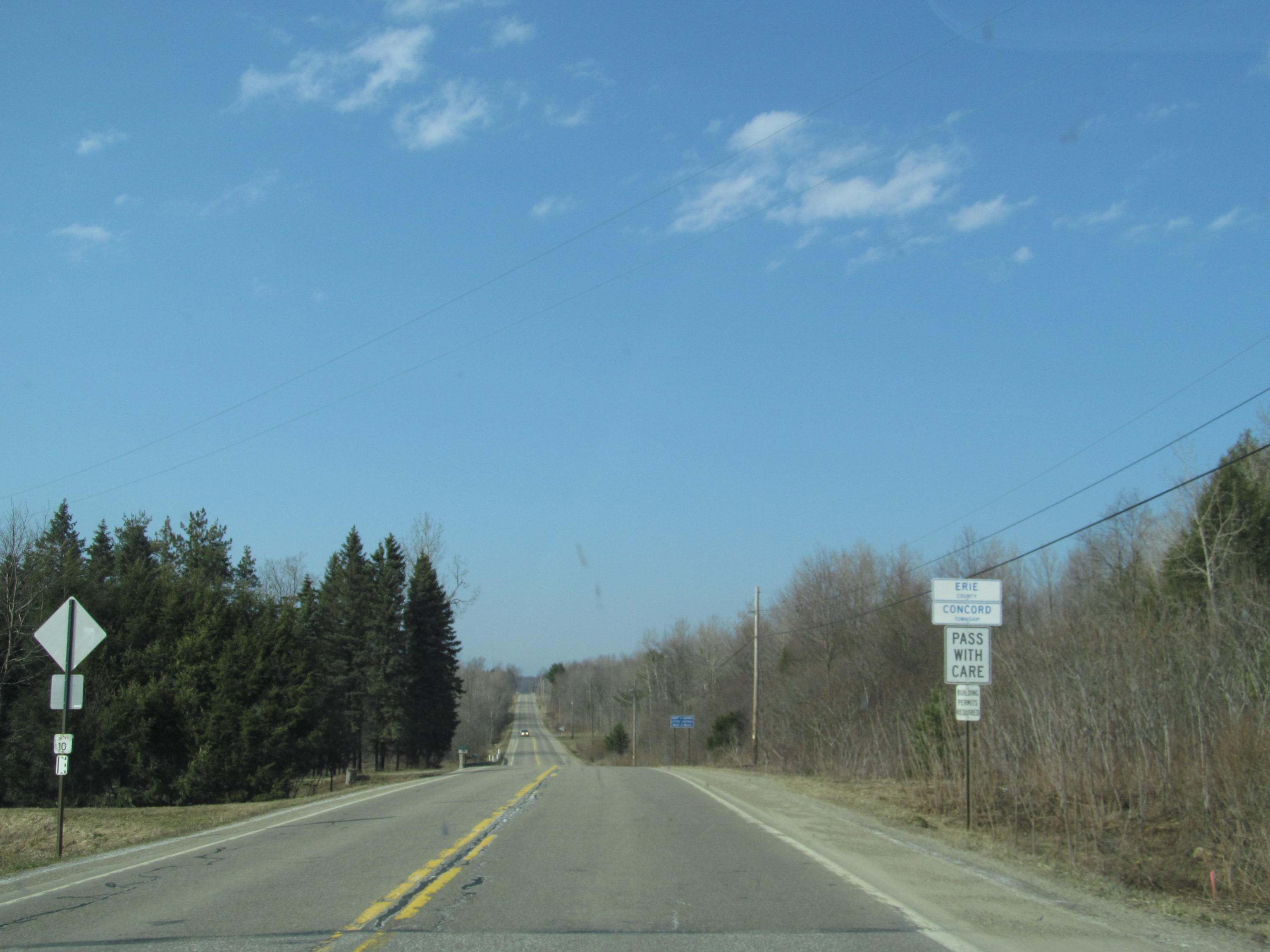
- PA 77 northbound entering Concord Township

- Location in Erie County and the U.S. state of Pennsylvania
- Country: United States
- State: Pennsylvania
- County: Erie

Area
  - Total: 33.18 sq mi (85.93 km^{2})
  - Land: 33.11 sq mi (85.75 km^{2})
  - Water: 0.069 sq mi (0.18 km^{2})
- Highest elevation (west of Lindsey Road): 1,900 ft (580 m)
  - Rank: Highest point in Erie County
- Lowest elevation (South Branch French Creek): 1,335 ft (407 m)

Population (2020)
  - Total: 1,281 ▼
  - Estimate (2024): 1,257
  - Density: 39.2/sq mi (15.13/km^{2})
- Time zone: UTC-4 (EST)
  - Summer (DST): UTC-5 (EDT)
- Area code: 814
- FIPS code: 42-049-15504

Concord Township is a township in Erie County, Pennsylvania, United States. The population was 1,281 at the 2020 census,

== Geography ==
Concord Township occupies the southeastern corner of Erie County. It is bordered to the east by Warren County and to the south by Crawford County. According to the United States Census Bureau, the township has a total area of 33.2 square miles (85.9 km^{2}), of which 33.1 square miles (85.7 km^{2}) is land and 0.1 square miles (0.2 km^{2}), or 0.21%, is water. The South Branch of French Creek, part of the Allegheny River watershed, rises in the township. Tributaries to South Branch French Creek in the township include Lilley Run, Beaver Run, Spencer Creek, and Baskin Run.

== Demographics ==
Historical population
Census	Pop.	Note	%±
2000	1,361		—
2010	1,344		−1.2%
2020	1,281		−4.7%
2024 (est.)	1,257		−1.9%
U.S. Decennial Census

As of the census of 2000, there were 1,361 people, 490 households, and 385 families residing in the township. The population density was 41.2 inhabitants per square mile (15.9/km^{2}). There were 536 housing units at an average density of 16.2/sq mi (6.3/km^{2}). The racial makeup of the township was 98.38% White, 0.15% African American, 0.73% Asian, 0.07% from other races, and 0.66% from two or more races. Hispanic or Latino of any race were 0.22% of the population.

There were 490 households, out of which 36.7% had children under the age of 18 living with them, 64.3% were married couples living together, 9.2% had a female householder with no husband present, and 21.4% were non-families. 18.4% of all households were made up of individuals, and 8.2% had someone living alone who was 65 years of age or older. The average household size was 2.77 and the average family size was 3.11.

In the township the population was spread out, with 27.9% under the age of 18, 6.2% from 18 to 24, 28.1% from 25 to 44, 24.8% from 45 to 64, and 12.9% who were 65 years of age or older. The median age was 38 years. For every 100 females, there were 101.6 males. For every 100 females age 18 and over, there were 101.4 males.

The median income for a household in the township was $35,985, and the median income for a family was $40,962. Males had a median income of $30,433 versus $21,641 for females. The per capita income for the township was $15,409. About 6.8% of families and 7.3% of the population were below the poverty line, including 8.4% of those under age 18 and 2.6% of those age 65 or over.
