= Union City, Pennsylvania =

Borough in Pennsylvania, US

- Borough
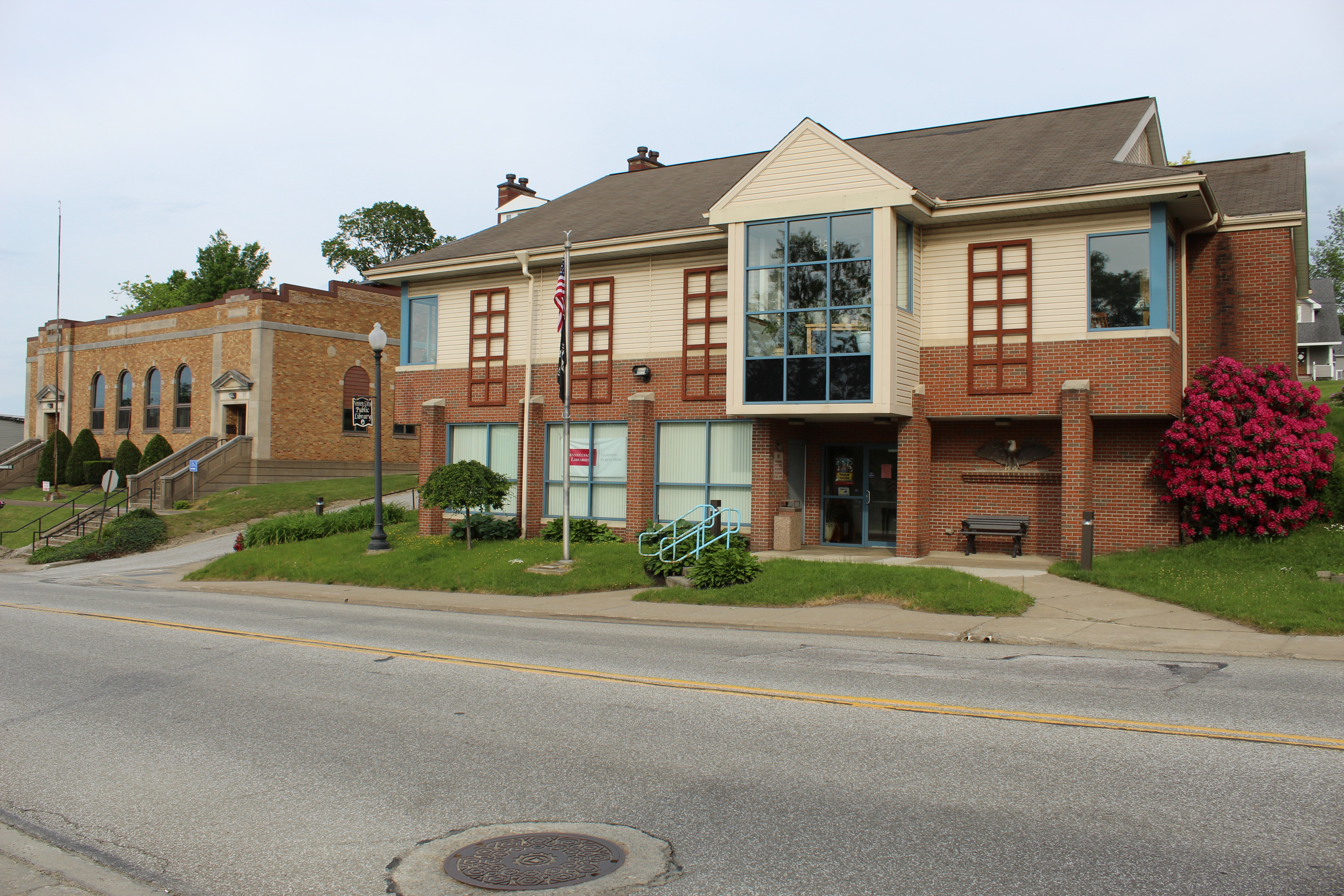
- Union City Public Library and South Main Arms

- Seal
- Motto: "Our Hometown"
- Location in Erie County and the U.S. state of Pennsylvania.
- Coordinates: 41°53′46″N 79°50′40″W
- Country: United States
- State: Pennsylvania
- County: Erie

Government
  - Mayor: Herb Riede

Area
  - Total: 1.86 sq mi (4.81 km^{2})
  - Land: 1.83 sq mi (4.74 km^{2})
  - Water: 0.027 sq mi (0.07 km^{2})
- Elevation (center of downtown): 1,265 ft (386 m)
- Highest elevation (north boundary of borough): 1,430 ft (440 m)
- Lowest elevation (South Branch French Creek): 1,238 ft (377 m)

Population (2020)
  - Total: 2,927
  - Density: 1,599.4/sq mi (617.53/km^{2})
- Time zone: UTC-4 (EST)
  - Summer (DST): UTC-5 (EDT)
- ZIP Code: 16438
- Area code: 814
- FIPS code: 42-78448
- Website: unioncitypa.us

Union City is a borough in Erie County, Pennsylvania, United States. It is located 22 miles (35 km) southeast of Erie. In the twentieth century, there were three large chair factories, planing and grist mills, a powdered milk plant, and several furniture factories. The population was 2,934 at the 2020 census. It is part of the Erie Metropolitan Statistical Area.

== History ==
The Union City Historic District was listed on the National Register of Historic Places on January 31, 1990, after Erie County Historical Society members John Claridge and William Sisson included historical information in a nomination document to the National Park Service in August, 1989. According to the document, it was established in 1800 as Miles Mills by William Miles. He built a dam on the south branch of French Creek and erected a gristmill and sawmill. Miles Mills consisted of only a few small mills until 1855, where towns were built around French Creek for the Philadelphia and Erie Railroad, which came in 1858. Shortly after, Edwin L. Drake successfully drilled for oil in Titusville, and the town became a rail head for oil. The Atlantic and Great Western rail line was built through Miles Mills in 1860, with the town creating three refineries and a barrel-making industry. The citizens incorporated the town as the Borough of Union Mills in 1865. After 1862, oil freight was diverted to Corry, and the oil barrel industry switched to wood products.

By 1870, the town's population had risen to 1,500, and the sawmills which had been shut down as part of the scramble for oil riches, were back in business. Six saw mills and planing mills including those of Clark, and Hunter and Wade, appear in the 1870 census. Barrels continued to be a major wood product and their importance increased in 1870 with the founding of Wood and Johnson's factory. It employed 70 workers and produced an annual inventory valued at $165,000. The company advertised itself as the largest manufacturer of oil barrels in the country. Sensing a new start the town changed its name to Union City in 1871.

The next decade revealed only modest changes in the town's socio-economic profile. Part of the slowdown was no doubt due to a disastrous fire which consumed most of the business establishments along both sides of Main Street south of the creek in 1879. But in the course of a few years what had been destroyed was replaced, and the new buildings were mostly of brick and in nearly every instance a great improvement over what had been there before. Typical was the town hall erected in 1884, a handsome brick building with accommodations for the town clerk and other officers, as well as council meetings and public gatherings. Coincident with all this activity was the transfer of the Union City Chair Co. from Jamestown, N.Y. in 1882. It signaled the beginning of Union City as an important center for furniture making in Pennsylvania.

The 1880's marked a decade of considerable residential construction. Whereas the owners of the town's many sawmills had tended to build their residences nearby, the constant threat of fire convinced the managers of the new furniture plants to erect their homes in the developing neighborhoods further removed. Among those who chose to build fine homes on higher ground west of the creek were John D. Wescott at 27 West High Street, Louis P. Hansen at 4 South Street, and Marvin Cooper at 30 Second Avenue.

Other prominent citizens who moved into this part of town during the same years were: merchant W. F. Conway at 27 Second Avenue, merchant James Smiley at 48 West High Street, banker R. Fuller at 28 Second Avenue, and physician E. B. Smith at 32 First Avenue. By 1900 a good percentage of the lots along West High Street and South Street and the avenues that connected them were filled.

Despite two crises, one local and one national, Union City managed to grow and prosper during the 1890's.

In 1892 following two torrential rainstorms, the south branch of French Creek overflowed its banks and flooded the center of the town. Several businesses along Main Street were destroyed, leading the Union City Times to declare the disaster "a serious blow to our thriving town..." The flood provided a complete reassessment of the use of the creek for waterpower, and at the same time sparked interest in public improvements in general. While the Main Street Bridge survived the flood, it was severely weakened, and a concrete one for its replacement was awarded in 1896. A campaign to pave Main Street was launched the following year and this was accomplished in 1899. In the meantime sewers had been laid along both Main and Crooked Streets.

Union City's inelastic wood products economy helped the town to weather the crippling depression of 1892. Local firms successfully bucked the financial tide. Blanchard and Hansen, a firm which combined casket making with furniture production, added a third floor to its Main Street plant. Increased orders at Novelty Wood Works required that company to put on a night shift. In 1897 the Union City Times reported that the real estate market had revived and that builders were advertising lots and moderately priced Queen Anne residential designs in large new subdivisions. Substantial homes began to go up again in the established neighborhoods as well, among them Dr. A. G. Sherwood's Colonial Revival residence at 25 West High Street, and Assemblyman John Mulkie's handsome Shingle Style mansion at First Avenue and South Street.

By the early 20th century Union City's "Mill and Mansion" era had pretty well ended. While eight houses would still be built in the West High Street/South Street district, they would be of a smaller scale and far less ornate than what was already there. This is also true of those homes erected beyond Third Avenue. While the area still remained essentially a neighborhood of single family dwellings, it could no longer claim to be the town's "A-No. 1 place-to-live."

Among the places of employment, things had changed too. The wood products industry with several new firms was still very important, but with the exception of the Union City Chair Co. it was no longer centered on Main Street and the creek. That company is the only one in existence that can trace its lineage directly to the 19th century and the "Mill and Mansion" period.

== Geography ==
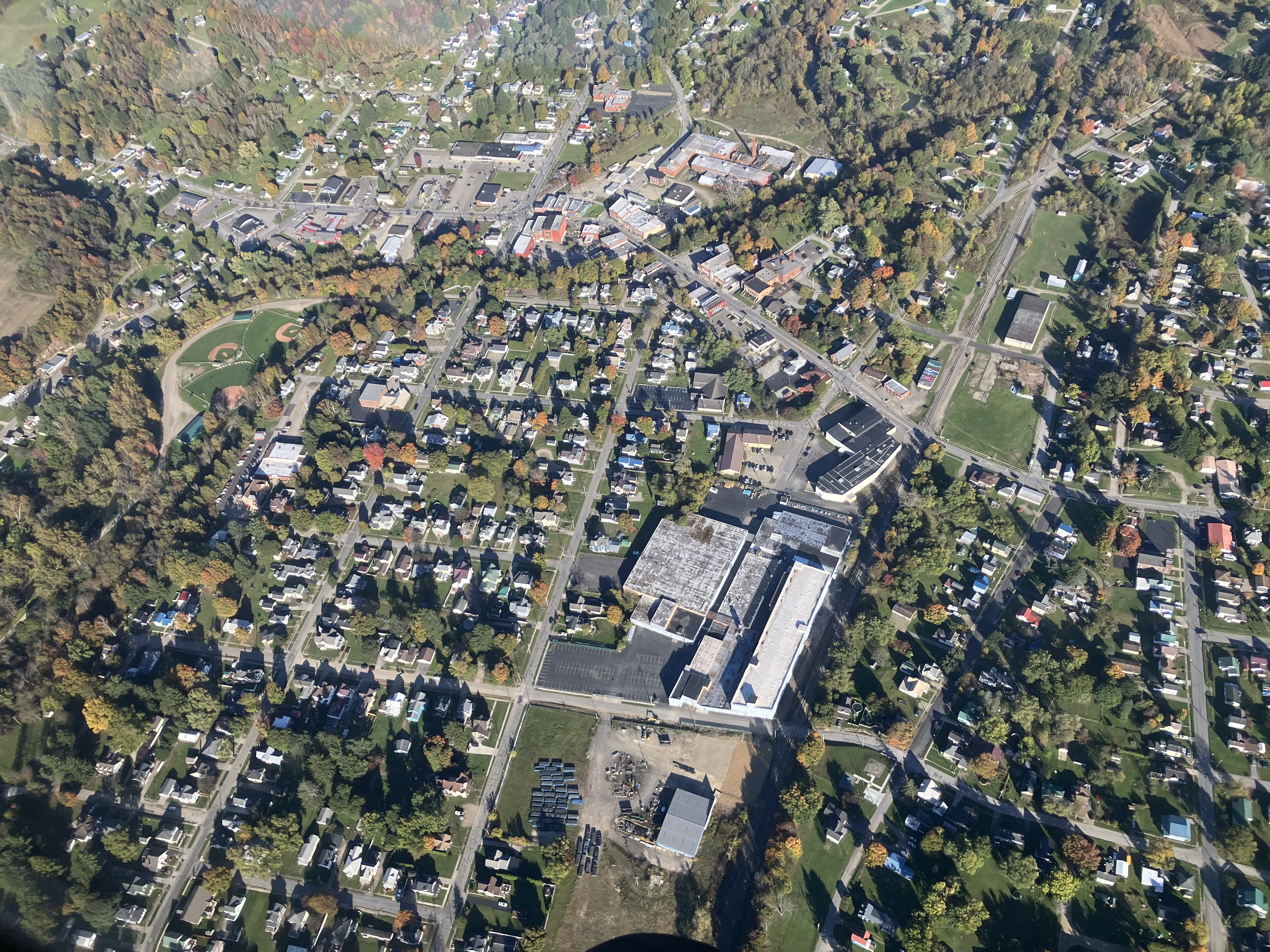
Union City from the air

Union City is in southeastern Erie County at 41°53′46″N 79°50′40″W (41.896056, -79.844425). It is surrounded by Union Township.

U.S. Route 6 and Pennsylvania Route 8 pass through the center of town as Main Street. US 6 heads east out of town on High Street, leading 11 miles (18 km) to Corry, and in the other direction turns southwest off Main Street onto Meadville Road, leading 30 miles (48 km) to Meadville. PA 8 leads north 8 miles (13 km) to Wattsburg and 27 miles (43 km) by an indirect route to Erie; to the south PA 8 leads 22 miles (35 km) to Titusville. Pennsylvania Route 97 heads west out of town as Waterford Street, leading 8 miles (13 km) to Waterford.

According to the U.S. Census Bureau, the borough has an area of 1.9 square miles (4.8 km^{2}), of which 0.03 square miles (0.07 km^{2}), or 1.36%, is water. The South Branch of French Creek, a tributary of the Allegheny River, flows east to west through the borough's center. Bentley Run, which supplies the Union City Reservoir, joins South Branch French Creek in Union City, Pennsylvania.

== Demographics ==
Historical population
Census	Pop.	Note	%±
1870	1,500		—
1880	2,171		44.7%
1890	2,261		4.1%
1900	3,104		37.3%
1910	3,684		18.7%
1920	3,850		4.5%
1930	3,788		−1.6%
1940	3,843		1.5%
1950	3,911		1.8%
1960	3,819		−2.4%
1970	3,638		−4.7%
1980	3,623		−0.4%
1990	3,537		−2.4%
2000	3,463		−2.1%
2010	3,320		−4.1%
2020	2,927		−11.8%
2021 (est.)	2,909	▼	−0.6%
U.S. Decennial Census

As of the census of 2000, there were 3,463 people, 1,326 households, and 900 families residing in the borough. The population density was 1,848.6 inhabitants per square mile (713.7/km^{2}). There were 1,422 housing units at an average density of 759.1 per square mile (293.1/km^{2}). The racial makeup of the borough was 97.92% White, 0.14% African American, 0.32% Native American, 0.75% Asian, 0.03% Pacific Islander, 0.23% from other races, and 0.61% from two or more races. Hispanic or Latino of any race were 0.84% of the population.

There were 1,326 households, out of which 37.9% had children under the age of 18 living with them, 48.0% were married couples living together, 14.9% had a female householder with no husband present, and 32.1% were non-families. 27.6% of all households were made up of individuals, and 14.4% had someone living alone who was 65 years of age or older. The average household size was 2.61 and the average family size was 3.16.

In the borough the population was spread out, with 30.1% under the age of 18, 9.3% from 18 to 24, 29.5% from 25 to 44, 18.8% from 45 to 64, and 12.4% who were 65 years of age or older. The median age was 32 years. For every 100 females there were 88.9 males. For every 100 females age 18 and over, there were 84.3 males.

The median income for a household in the borough was $27,216, and the median income for a family was $34,352. Males had a median income of $29,833 versus $21,016 for females. The per capita income for the borough was $12,599. About 17.9% of families and 20.9% of the population were below the poverty line, including 26.4% of those under age 18 and 12.9% of those age 65 or over.

== Education ==
Most children in Union City attend schools in the Union City Area School District. This school district also includes children from Crawford County. There is one elementary school, and the middle and high School are located in the same building. The school colors are green and white, and the mascot is a Bear. It received massive renovations in 2020.

== Museum ==
The Union City Historical Society Museum is a three-story building on Main Street. The museum has a large collection of artifacts dating from the 1780s to the present. Many of the items on the third floor were made by residents of the town.
