= Bentley Run =

Stream in Pennsylvania, USA

Bentley Run Tributary to South Branch French Creek
- Location of the mouth of Bentley Run Bentley Run (the United States)

Location
- Country: United States
- State: Pennsylvania
- County: Erie

Physical characteristics
- Source: divide between Alder Run, Bentley Run and Pine Run
  - location: just upstream of Union City Reservoir, about 1.0 mile northeast of Union City, Pennsylvania
  - coordinates: 41°55′51″N 079°47′39″W
  - elevation: 1,520 ft (460 m)
- Mouth: South Branch French Creek
  - location: Union City, Pennsylvania
  - coordinates: 41°53′50″N 079°50′12″W
  - elevation: 1,266 ft (386 m)
- Length: 1.2 mi (1.9 km)
- Basin size: 4.1 square miles (11 km^{2})
- Discharge
  - location: Union City, Pennsylvania
  - average: 8.09 cu ft/s (0.229 m^{3}/s) at mouth with South Branch French Creek

Basin features
- Progression: South Branch French Creek → French Creek → Allegheny River → Ohio River → Mississippi River → Gulf of Mexico
- River system: Allegheny River
- Tributaries
  - left: unnamed tributaries
  - right: unnamed tributaries
- Waterbodies: Union City Reservoir
- Bridges: Hoyt Road, US 6, Bridge Street, Willow Street

Bentley Run is a 1.2 mi (1.9 km) long 2nd order tributary to South Branch French Creek in Erie County, Pennsylvania.

== Course ==
Bentley Run rises in Union Township of southern Erie County, Pennsylvania and flows southwest towards Union City, Pennsylvania.

== Watershed ==
Bentley Run drains 4.1 square miles of Erie Drift Plain (glacial geology). The watershed receives an average of 46.4 in/year of precipitation.

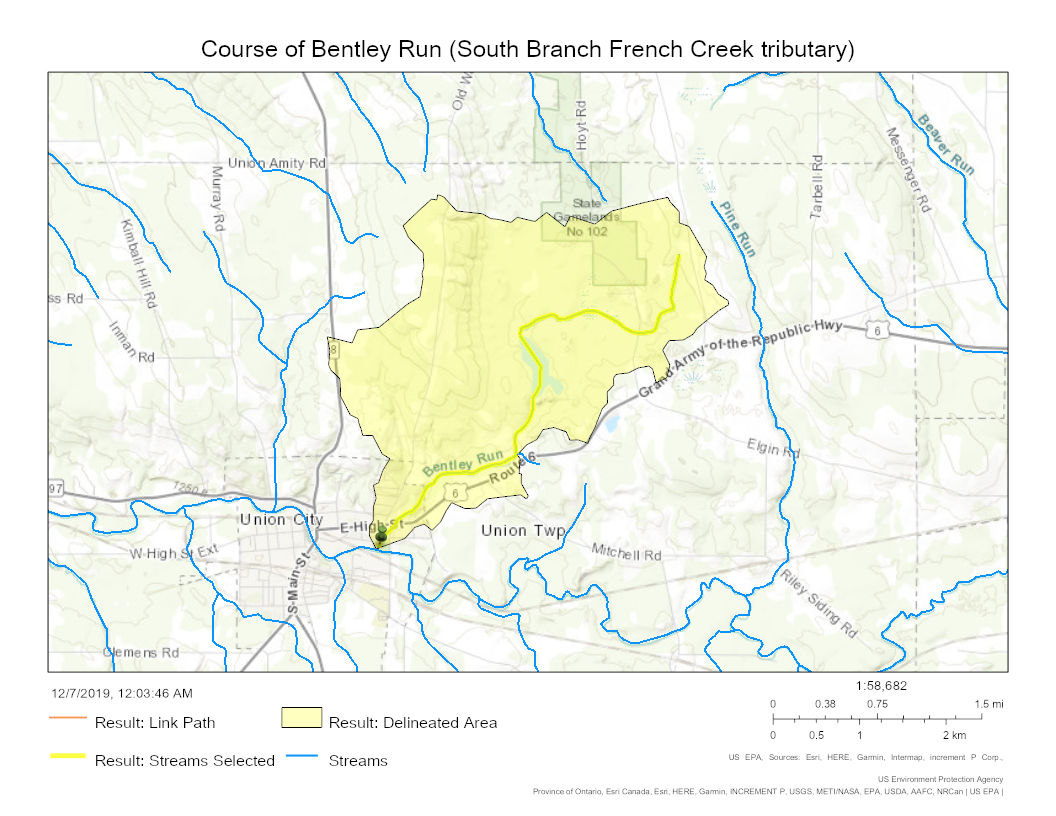
Course of Bentley Run (South Branch French Creek tributary)

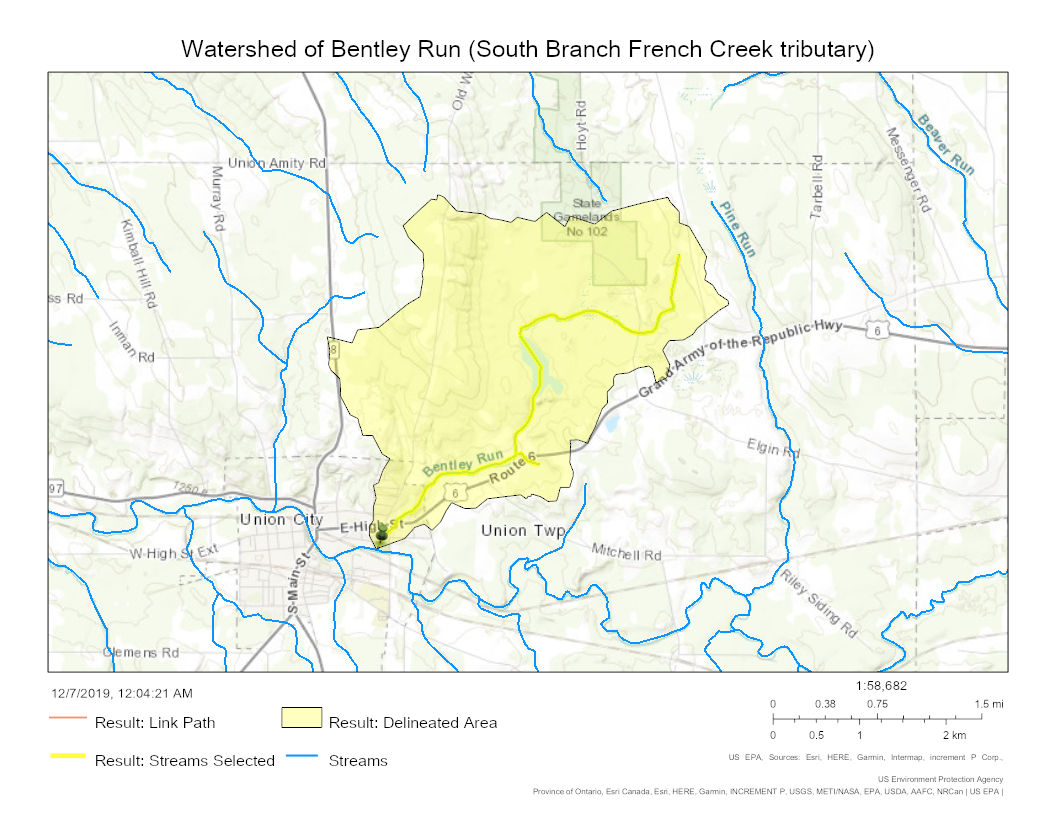
Watershed of Bentley Run (South Branch French Creek tributary)
