= Corry, Pennsylvania =

City in Pennsylvania, US

- City
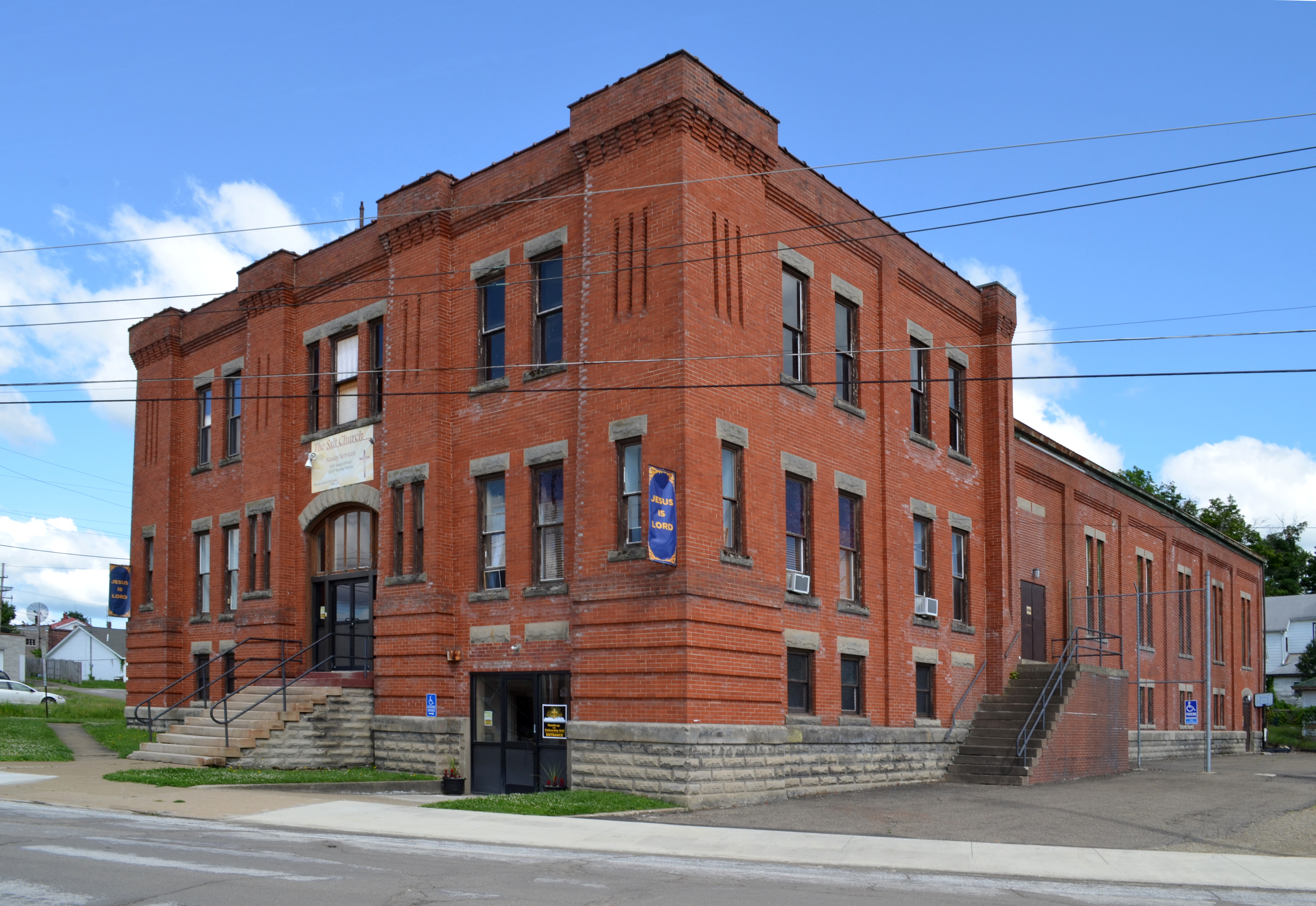
- Corry Armory (2014)

- Symbol

- Location within Erie County and Pennsylvania
- Coordinates: 41°55′13.2″N 79°38′25.2″W
- Country: United States
- State: Pennsylvania
- County: Erie
- Founded: 1861
- Incorporated: 1866
- Named for: misspelling of founder Hiram Cory's name

Government
  - Mayor: Michael E. Baker

Area
  - Total: 6.01 sq mi (15.56 km^{2})
  - Land: 5.99 sq mi (15.52 km^{2})
  - Water: 0.015 sq mi (0.04 km^{2})

Population (2020)
  - Total: 6,210
  - Density: 1,040/sq mi (400/km^{2})
- Time zone: UTC-4 (EST)
  - Summer (DST): UTC−5 (EDT)
- ZIP Code: 16407
- Area code: 814
- FIPS code: 42-16296
- Website: corrypa.org

Corry is a city in northwestern Pennsylvania, United States. As of the 2020 census, the population of the city was 6,210, and it is the second largest city in Erie County. The city became famous in the late-19th and early-20th centuries for being the manufacturer of Climax locomotives.

== History ==
Erie County was formed from parts of Allegheny County on March 12, 1800. On May 27, 1861, tracks owned by the Atlantic and Great Western Railroad intersected with those of the Sunbury and Erie Railroad and was called the "Atlantic and Erie Junction". Land at the junction was owned by Hiram Cory, who sold a portion to the Atlantic and Great Western in October 1861. The railroad built a ticket office at the junction and named it for Cory, but through a misspelling it became Corry.

The combination of railroad growth and the first national oil wells developed by Edwin Drake for the Pennsylvania Rock Oil Company in nearby Titusville contributed greatly to Corry's development. This boomtown was chartered as a borough in 1863 and designated as a city in 1866. Industry has played a big part in Corry's growth, and the Corry Area Historical Society, Inc. maintains a museum where one of the Climax locomotives (the steam engine used in logging operations that brought fame to Corry) is on display. Since 2020 a "Class A" Climax locomotive is being restored at a location near the original locomotive works by a local non-profit organization set up for this project.

Corry has been named a Tree City USA for seven consecutive years.

The Corry Armory was listed on the National Register of Historic Places in 1991.

== Geography ==
Corry is located at 41°55′30″N 79°38′26″W (41.924947, -79.640511). According to the United States Census Bureau, the city has a total area of 6.1 square miles (16 km^{2}), all land.

=== Climate ===
Climate data for Corry, Pennsylvania
Month	Jan	Feb	Mar	Apr	May	Jun	Jul	Aug	Sep	Oct	Nov	Dec	Year
Record high °F (°C)	70 (21)	69 (21)	82 (28)	88 (31)	91 (33)	99 (37)	110 (43)	100 (38)	96 (36)	91 (33)	78 (26)	70 (21)	110 (43)
Mean daily maximum °F (°C)	32.3 (0.2)	34.7 (1.5)	44.2 (6.8)	57.7 (14.3)	69.4 (20.8)	77.6 (25.3)	81.5 (27.5)	79.5 (26.4)	73.0 (22.8)	61.9 (16.6)	47.6 (8.7)	35.8 (2.1)	58.2 (14.6)
Mean daily minimum °F (°C)	16.2 (−8.8)	16.1 (−8.8)	23.7 (−4.6)	34.0 (1.1)	43.2 (6.2)	52.3 (11.3)	56.7 (13.7)	55.2 (12.9)	49.0 (9.4)	39.1 (3.9)	31.2 (−0.4)	21.4 (−5.9)	36.7 (2.6)
Record low °F (°C)	−30 (−34)	−30 (−34)	−19 (−28)	−5 (−21)	19 (−7)	28 (−2)	33 (1)	30 (−1)	25 (−4)	11 (−12)	−2 (−19)	−22 (−30)	−30 (−34)
Average rainfall inches (mm)	3.32 (84)	2.82 (72)	3.65 (93)	3.92 (100)	3.74 (95)	4.47 (114)	4.30 (109)	3.98 (101)	3.92 (100)	3.69 (94)	4.21 (107)	3.92 (100)	45.96 (1,167)
Average snowfall inches (cm)	27.2 (69)	21.6 (55)	17.5 (44)	5.1 (13)	0.2 (0.51)	0 (0)	0 (0)	0 (0)	0 (0)	1.3 (3.3)	14.8 (38)	30.5 (77)	117.5 (298)
Source: Pennsylvania State University

== Demographics ==
Historical population
Census	Pop.	Note	%±
1870	6,726		—
1880	5,277		−21.5%
1890	5,321		0.8%
1900	5,389		1.3%
1910	5,991		11.2%
1920	7,228		20.6%
1930	7,489		3.6%
1940	6,890		−8.0%
1950	6,887		0.0%
1960	7,123		3.4%
1970	7,367		3.4%
1980	7,159		−2.8%
1990	6,917		−3.4%
2000	6,743		−2.5%
2010	6,618		−1.9%
2020	6,210		−6.2%
2021 (est.)	6,164		−0.7%

Corry is a part of the Erie, PA Metropolitan Statistical Area.

=== 2020 census ===
As of the 2020 census, Corry had a population of 6,210. The median age was 39.9 years. 23.5% of residents were under the age of 18 and 19.9% of residents were 65 years of age or older. For every 100 females there were 96.0 males, and for every 100 females age 18 and over there were 93.5 males age 18 and over.

93.6% of residents lived in urban areas, while 6.4% lived in rural areas.

There were 2,561 households in Corry, of which 29.8% had children under the age of 18 living in them. Of all households, 37.3% were married-couple households, 21.5% were households with a male householder and no spouse or partner present, and 31.4% were households with a female householder and no spouse or partner present. About 32.3% of all households were made up of individuals and 15.2% had someone living alone who was 65 years of age or older.

There were 2,799 housing units, of which 8.5% were vacant. The homeowner vacancy rate was 1.6% and the rental vacancy rate was 6.1%.

Racial composition as of the 2020 census
Race	Number	Percent
White	5,734	92.3%
Black or African American	45	0.7%
American Indian and Alaska Native	16	0.3%
Asian	10	0.2%
Native Hawaiian and Other Pacific Islander	0	0.0%
Some other race	27	0.4%
Two or more races	378	6.1%
Hispanic or Latino (of any race)	90	1.4%

=== 2000 census ===
As of the census of 2000, there were 6,834 people, 2,660 households, and 1,763 families residing in the city. The population density was 1,120.5 inhabitants per square mile (432.6/km^{2}). There were 2,868 housing units at an average density of 470.2 per square mile (181.5/km^{2}). The racial makeup of the city was 98.19% White, 0.29% African American, 0.29% Native American, 0.16% Asian, 0.01% Pacific Islander, 0.09% from other races, and 0.97% from two or more races. Hispanic or Latino of any race were 0.91% of the population.

There were 2,660 households, out of which 32.1% had children under the age of 18 living with them, 48.5% were married couples living together, 13.8% had a female householder with no husband present, and 33.7% were non-families. 29.3% of all households were made up of individuals, and 13.2% had someone living alone who was 65 years of age or older. The average household size was 2.49 and the average family size was 3.07.

In the city, the population was spread out, with 27.3% under the age of 18, 8.6% from 18 to 24, 25.5% from 25 to 44, 21.8% from 45 to 64, and 16.8% who were 65 years of age or older. The median age was 36 years. For every 100 females, there were 88.4 males. For every 100 females age 18 and over, there were 83.1 males.

The median income for a household in the city was $30,967, and the median income for a family was $35,375. Males had a median income of $30,220 versus $22,127 for females. The per capita income for the city was $15,143. About 14.2% of families and 16.4% of the population were below the poverty line, including 21.4% of those under age 18 and 8.2% of those age 65 or over.

== Government ==
The city of Corry is incorporated as a 3rd-class city under Pennsylvania law. Third-class cities are governed by a commission consisting of a mayor and four others. The current mayor is Michael E. Baker, and City Administrator is Joanne Smith.

Corry is in Pennsylvania's 5th congressional district and is represented in the United States House of Representatives by Republican Glenn Thompson, who was elected in 2008. Republican Scott Hutchinson of the 21st District has represented Corry in the Pennsylvania State Senate since 2013. Corry is contained by the 4th District of the Pennsylvania House of Representatives and is represented by Republican Curt Sonney.

== Education ==
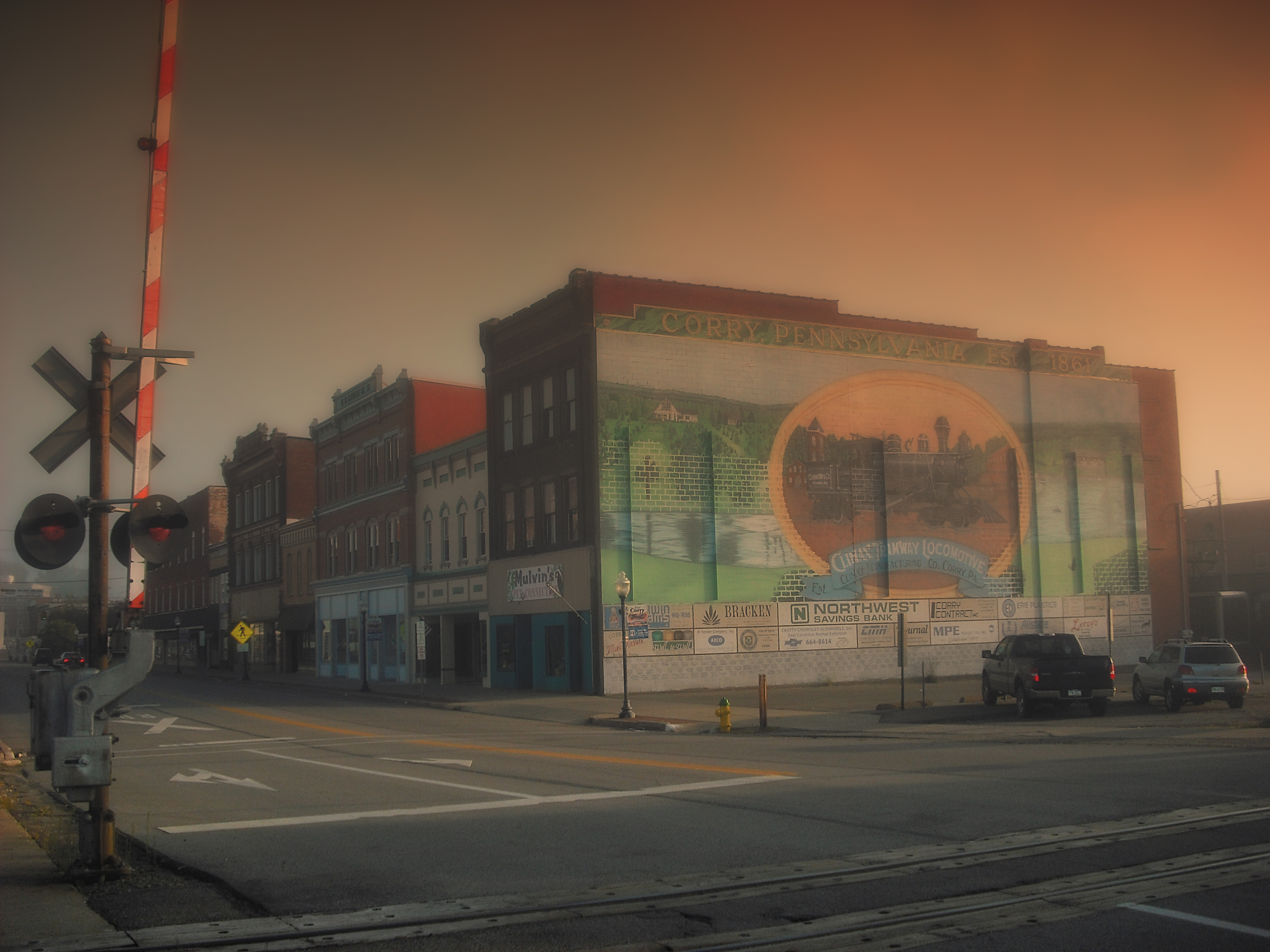
An early morning view of Corry

Corry is within the Corry Area School District, which operates a middle school, high school, one elementary school, but two abandoned elementary schools, and a career and technical center. Higher education is locally available through the Corry branch of Mercyhurst College, which offers advanced college credits for high school students and an associate degree in business administration. Adult education and training are offered through the Corry Higher Education Council.

== Notable people ==
- Emery Bopp (1924–2007), artist
- William Wallace Brown (1836–1926), member of the United States House of Representatives
- Ryan Buell (1982−), paranormal investigator
- Carmen Hill (1895–1990), Major League Baseball player, Corry HS
- Fred Marsh (1924–2006), Major League Baseball player
- Peter McLaughlin, Minnesota state legislator
- Norman T. Newton (1898–1992), Landscape Architect, Scholar
- Charles F. Ritchel (1840–1911), inventor
- James Alexander Robertson (1873−1939), academic historian, archivist and bibliographer
- Karen Smyers (1961−), triathlete

== See also ==
- List of Tree Cities USA

== Sources ==
- Bates, Samuel P (1882). History of Erie County. Chicago: Warner, Beers & Co.
- "Erie County Elected Officials" (PDF). Government of Erie County. Archived from the original (PDF) on July 21, 2011.
- Trostle, Sharon, ed. (2009). The Pennsylvania Manual. Vol. 119. Harrisburg, Pennsylvania: Pennsylvania Department of General Services. ISBN 978-0-8182-0334-3.
