= List of rivers of Pennsylvania =

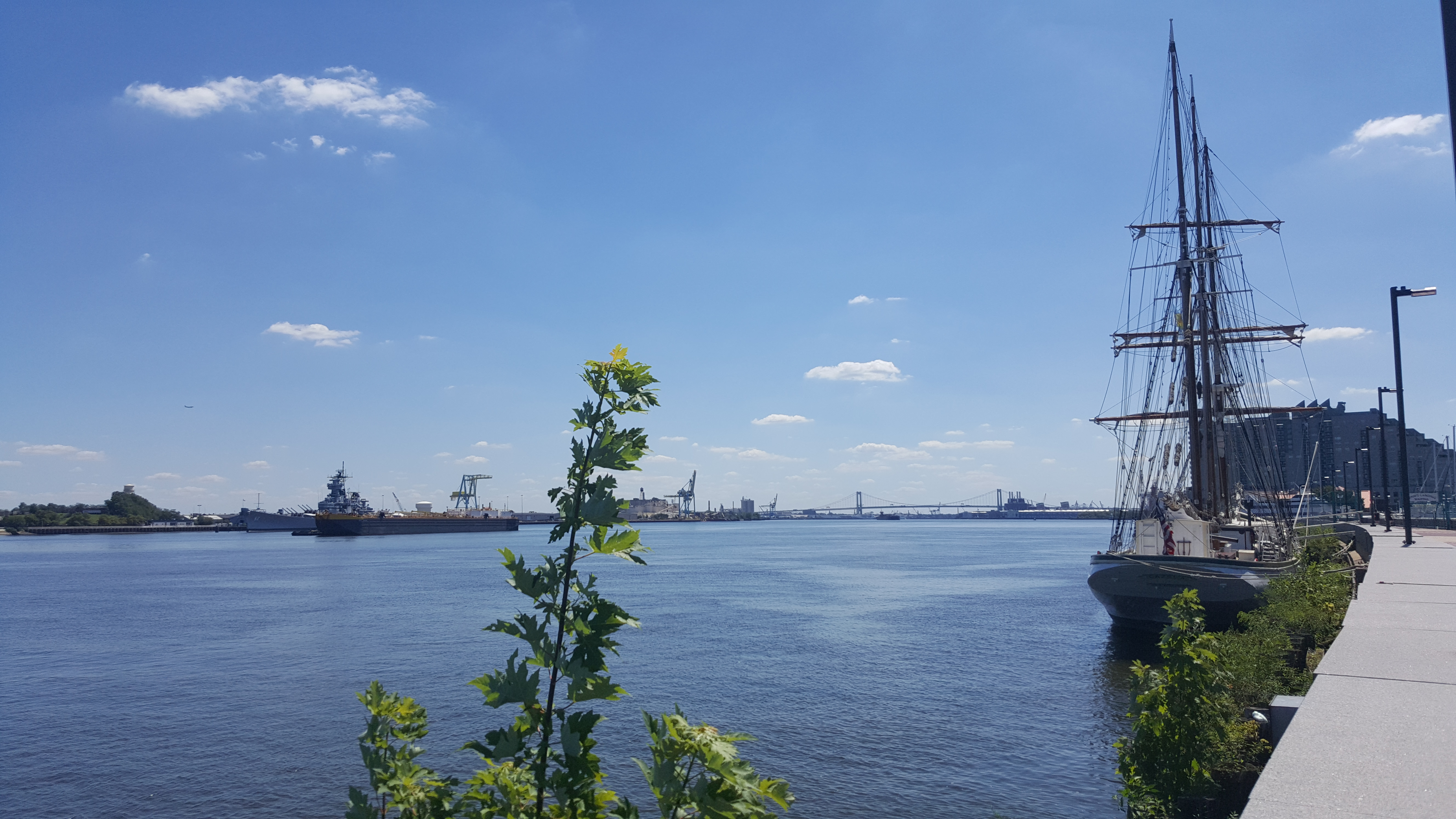
The Delaware River in Philadelphia

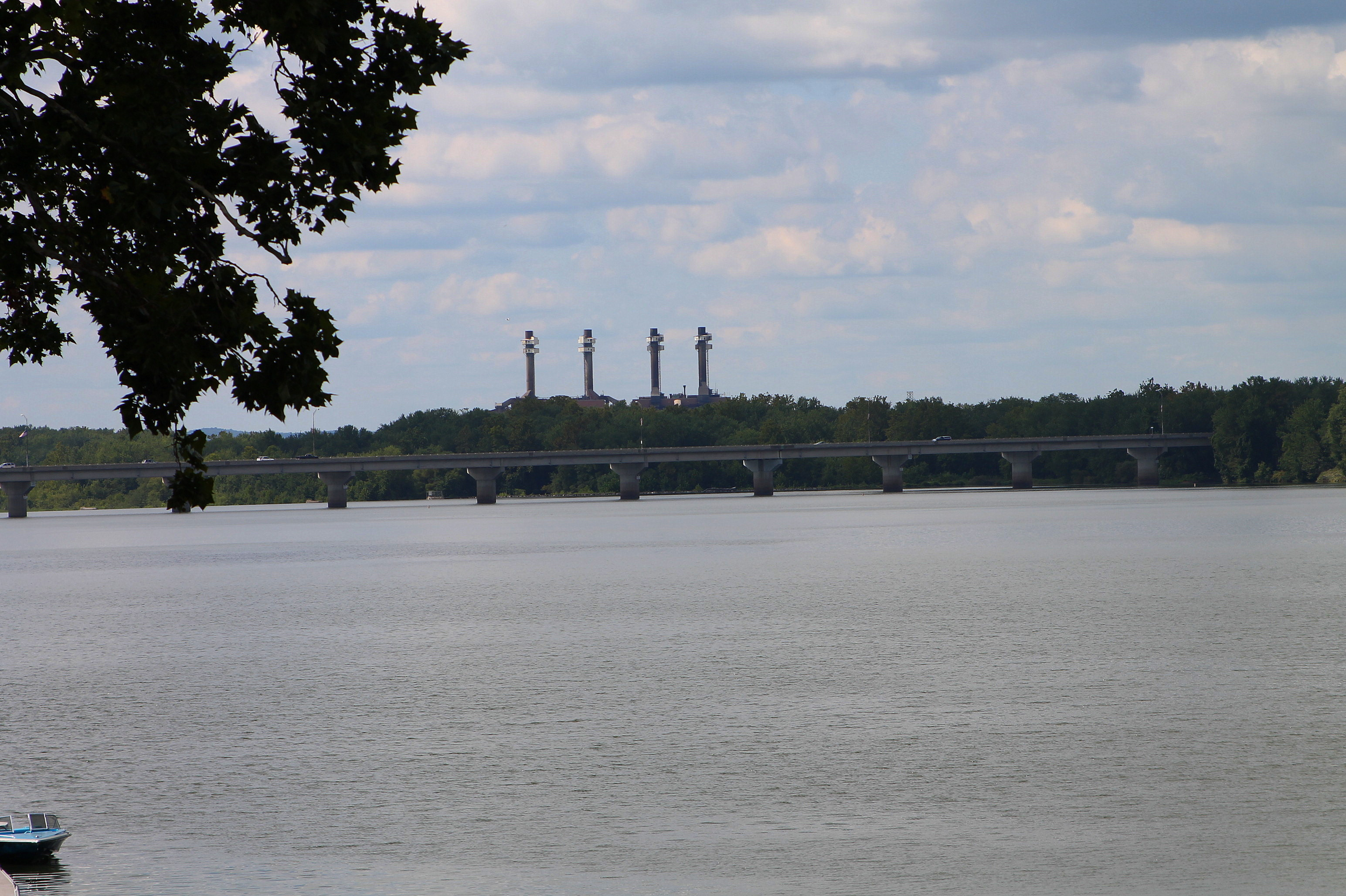
The Susquehanna River near Sunbury

This is a list of streams and rivers in the U.S. state of Pennsylvania.

== By drainage basin ==
This list is arranged by drainage basin, with respective tributaries indented under each larger stream's name.

=== Delaware Bay ===
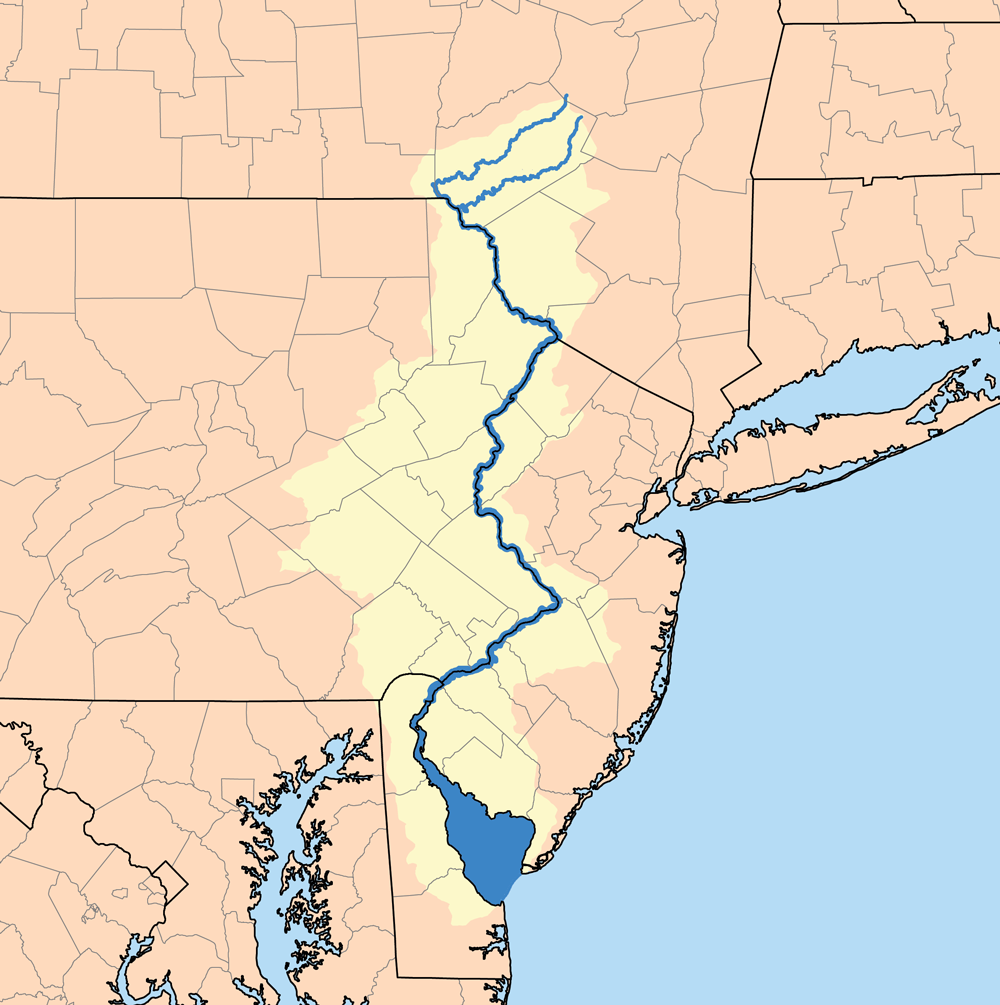
The Delaware River drainage basin

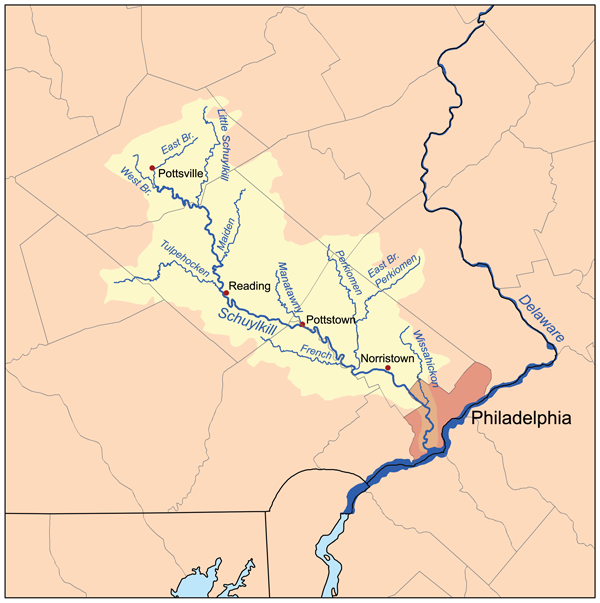
The Schuylkill River drainage basin

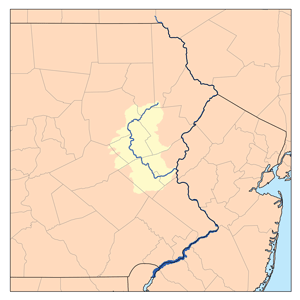
The Lehigh River drainage basin

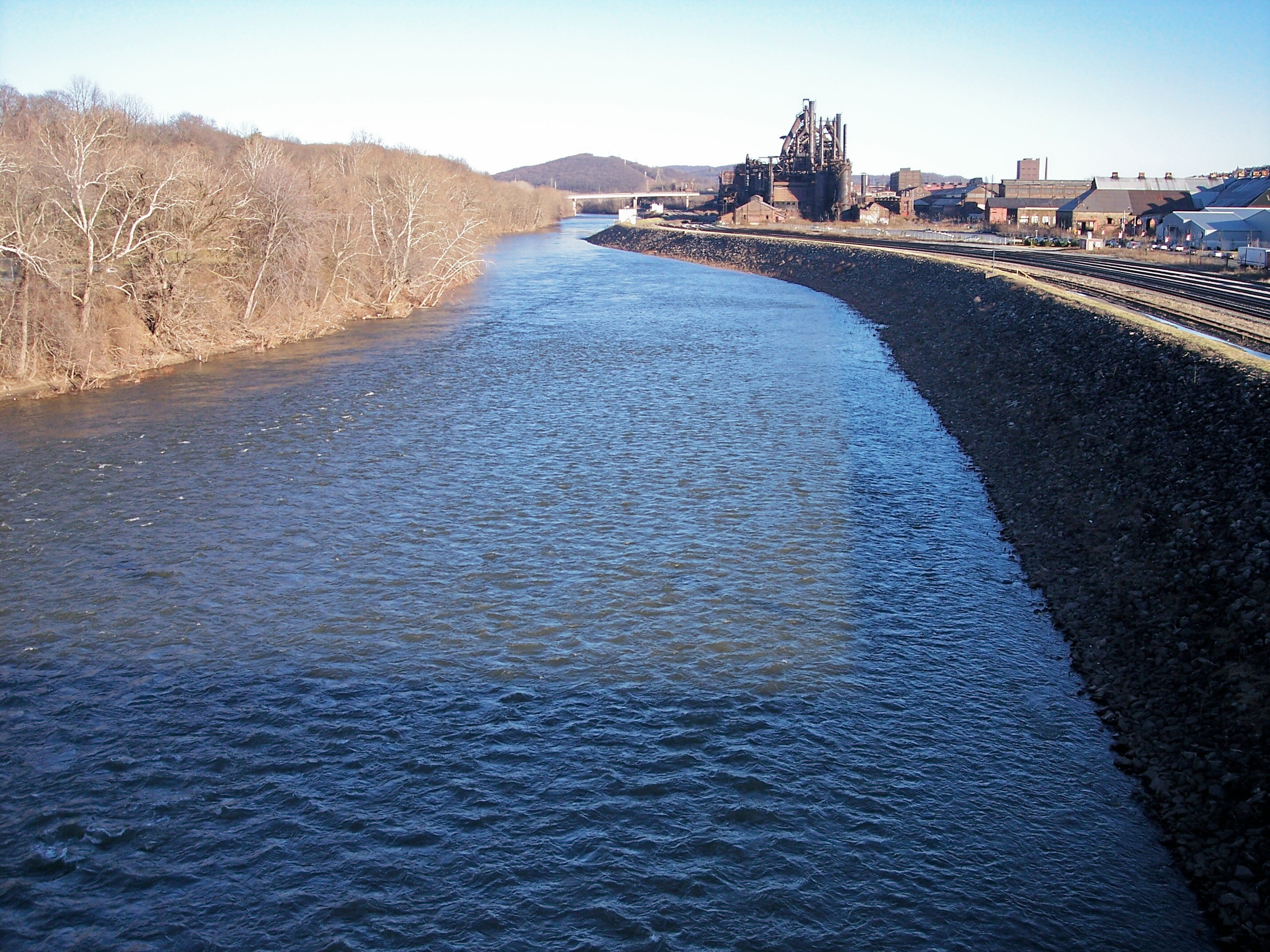
The Lehigh River in Bethlehem

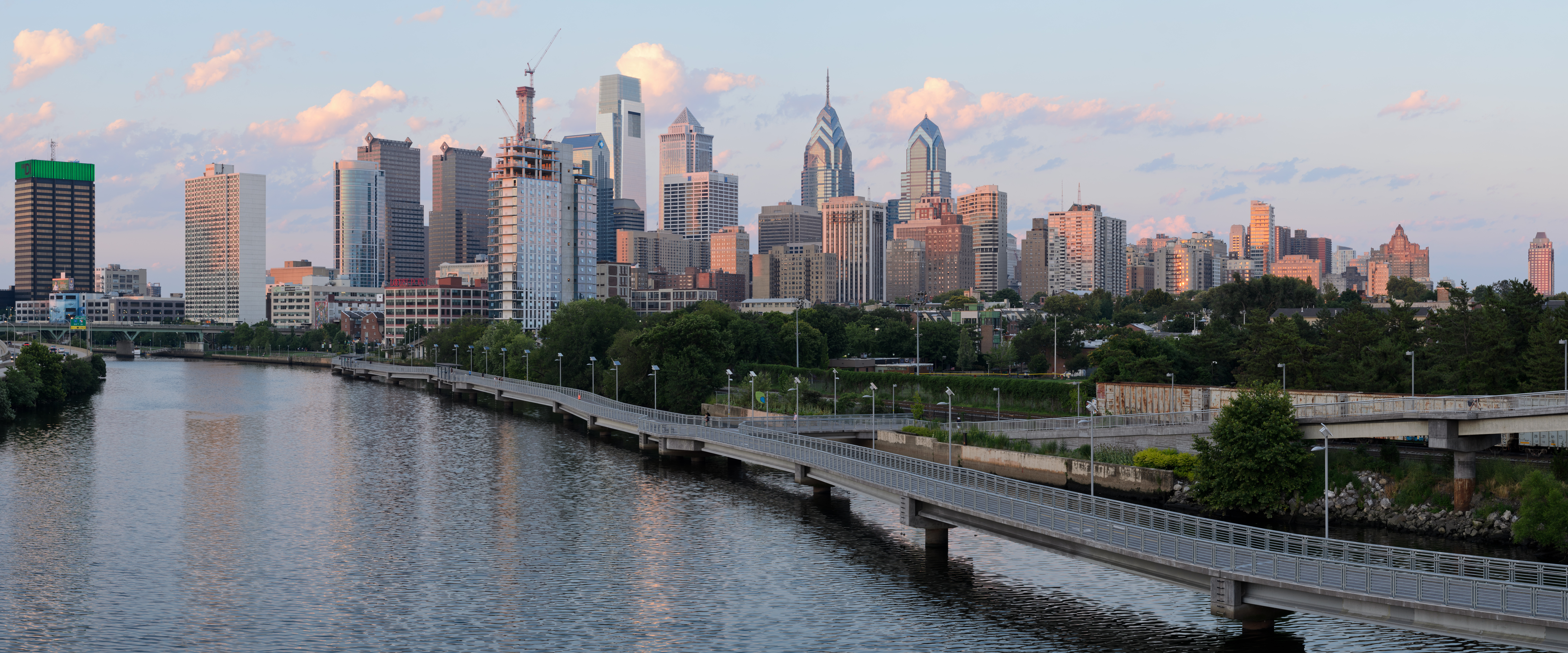
The Schuylkill River in Philadelphia

- Delaware River
  - Christina River
    - Brandywine Creek
      - Pocopson Creek
      - East Branch Brandywine Creek
        - Valley Creek
      - West Branch Brandywine Creek
        - Broad Run
        - Buck Run
          - Doe Run
    - White Clay Creek
      - Red Clay Creek
        - Burrows Run
      - Mill Creek
      - Broad Run
      - Bogy Run
      - Middle Run
      - Walnut Run
  - Naamans Creek
  - Marcus Hook Creek
  - Stoney Creek
  - Chester Creek
    - Baldwin Run
    - Rocky Run
    - Goose Creek
    - East Branch Chester Creek
    - West Branch Chester Creek
      - Webb Creek
  - Ridley Creek
    - Vernon Run
    - Spring Run
    - Dismal Run
    - Hunters Run
  - Crum Creek
    - Little Crum Creek
    - Stony Creek
    - Trout Run
    - West Crum Creek
  - Darby Creek
    - Stoney Creek
    - Muckinipattis Creek
    - Hermesprota Creek
    - Bow Creek (Tidal stream, flowed into what once was the back channel of Hog Island. Obliterated due to the expansion of I 95.)
    - Cobbs Creek
      - Naylors Run
      - Indian Creek
    - Ithan Creek
      - Meadowbrook Run
    - Little Darby Creek
  - Schuylkill River
    - Shed Brook (In Franklin Delano Roosevelt Park.)
    - Mingo Creek (Tidal stream, formerly flowed into Eastwick, Philadelphia. Now converted to a surge basin.)
    - Mill Creek (Philadelphia)
    - Wissahickon Creek
      - Paper Mill Run
      - Cresheim Creek
      - Sandy Run
    - Mill Creek (Montgomery County, Pennsylvania)
    - Plymouth Creek
    - Gulph Creek
    - Stony Creek
    - Valley Creek
    - Trout Creek
    - Perkiomen Creek
      - Skippack Creek
        - Towamencin Creek
      - East Branch Perkiomen Creek
        - Pleasant Spring Creek
      - Swamp Creek
        - Scioto Creek
      - Unami Creek
        - Ridge Valley Creek
      - Macoby Creek
      - West Branch Perkiomen Creek
      - Hosensack Creek
    - Pickering Creek
    - French Creek
      - Scotts Run
    - Mingo Creek (Montgomery County, Pennsylvania)
    - Pigeon Creek
    - Manatawny Creek
      - Ironstone Creek
      - Little Manatawny Creek
      - Bieber Creek
      - Pine Creek
    - Monocacy Creek
    - Hay Creek
    - Antietam Creek
    - Allegheny Creek
    - Angelica Creek
    - Wyomissing Creek
    - Tulpehocken Creek
      - Cacoosing Creek
      - Plum Creek
      - Northkill Creek
        - Little Northkill Creek
        - Wolf Creek
      - Spring Creek
      - Mill Creek
    - Maiden Creek
      - Willow Creek
      - Moselem Creek
      - Sacony Creek
        - Mill Creek
      - Stony Run
      - Kistler Creek
      - Ontelaunee Creek
    - Irish Creek
    - Mill Creek
    - Little Schuylkill River
      - Indian Run
      - Wabash Creek
      - Panther Creek
      - Locust Creek
      - Pine Creek
    - Pine Creek
    - West Branch Schuylkill River
      - West West Branch Schuylkill River
        - West Creek
    - Norwegian Creek
    - Mill Creek (Port Carbon, Pennsylvania)
    - Silver Creek
  - Hollander's Creek (in Franklin Delano Roosevelt Park)
  - Dock Creek
  - Cohoquinoque Creek
  - Cohocksink Creek
  - Gunner's Run (obliterated to sewer)
  - Frankford Creek
    - Little Tacony Creek (obliterated to sewer)
    - Tacony Creek
    - Wingohocking Creek
  - Wissinoming Creek (obliterated to sewer)
  - Pennypack Creek
  - Poquessing Creek
    - Byberry Creek
    - Bloody Run
  - Neshaminy Creek
    - Mill Creek
      - Pine Run
      - Ironworks Creek
    - Newtown Creek
    - Mill Creek
      - Robin Run
      - Watson Creek
      - Lahaska Creek
    - Little Neshaminy Creek
      - Park Creek
    - Cooks Run
    - Mill Creek
    - North Branch Neshaminy Creek
      - Pine Run
    - West Branch Neshaminy Creek
      - Reading Creek
  - Mill Creek
    - Queen Anne Creek
    - Black Ditch Creek
    - Adams Hollow Creek
  - Martins Creek
  - Scotts Creek
  - Biles Creek
  - Buck Creek
    - Brock Creek
  - Dyers Creek
  - Houghs Creek
  - Jericho Creek
  - Pidcock Creek
    - Curls Run
  - Dark Hollow Run
  - Aquetong Creek
  - Rabbit Run
  - Cuttalosa Creek
  - Paunnacussing Creek
  - Hickory Creek
  - Tohickon Creek
    - Geddes Run
    - Cabin Run
    - Deep Run
    - Wolf Run
    - Deer Run
    - Mink Run
    - Haycock Creek
    - Threemile Run
    - Dimple Creek
    - Dry Branch Creek
    - Morgan Creek
    - Beaver Run
      - Licking Run
  - Smithtown Creek
  - Tinicum Creek
    - Beaver Creek
    - Rapp Creek
  - Swamp Creek
  - Falls Creek
  - Gallows Run
  - Rodges Run
  - Cooks Creek
    - Hollow Run
  - Lehigh River
    - Saucon Creek
      - East Branch Saucon Creek
      - Laurel Run
    - Monocacy Creek
      - East Branch Monocacy Creek
    - Little Lehigh Creek
      - Jordan Creek
      - Cedar Creek
      - Spring Creek
      - Swabia Creek
    - Catasauqua Creek
    - Coplay Creek
    - Hokendauqua Creek
      - Indian Creek
    - Trout Creek
    - Aquashicola Creek
      - Buckwha Creek
    - Lizard Creek
    - Pohopoco Creek
    - Mahoning Creek
    - Mauch Chunk Creek / White Bear Creek
    - Nesquehoning Creek
      - Jeans Run
    - Black Creek
      - Quakake Creek
      - Beaver Creek
      - Hazle Creek
    - Mud Run
    - Bear Creek
    - Tobyhanna Creek
      - Tunkhannock Creek
        - South Branch Tunkhannock Creek
  - Bushkill Creek
    - Little Bushkill Creek
  - Martins Creek
  - Cherry Creek
  - Brodhead Creek
    - Marshalls Creek
    - McMichael Creek
      - Pocono Creek
      - Appenzell Creek
    - Paradise Creek
      - Swiftwater Creek
    - Stony Run
    - Buck Hill Creek
    - Leavitt Branch
    - Middle Branch Brodhead Creek
  - Big Bushkill Creek
    - Little Bush Kill
    - Saw Creek
    - Rock Hill Creek
  - Raymondskill Creek
    - Dwarf Kill
  - Dingmans Creek
  - Sawkill Creek
  - Shohola Creek
  - Lackawaxen River
    - Blooming Grove Creek
    - Wallenpaupack Creek
      - West Branch Wallenpaupack Creek
      - East Branch Wallenpaupack Creek
        - Bridge Creek
    - Middle Creek
    - Carley Brook
    - Dyberry Creek
      - West Branch Dyberry Creek
    - Van Auken Creek
    - West Branch Lackawaxen River
      - Johnson Creek
  - Calkins Creek
  - Equinunk Creek
  - West Branch Delaware River
    - Shehawken Creek

=== Chesapeake Bay ===
- Elk River (MD)
  - Big Elk Creek
  - Little Elk Creek
- North East River (MD)
  - North East Creek
- Gunpowder River

==== Susquehanna River ====
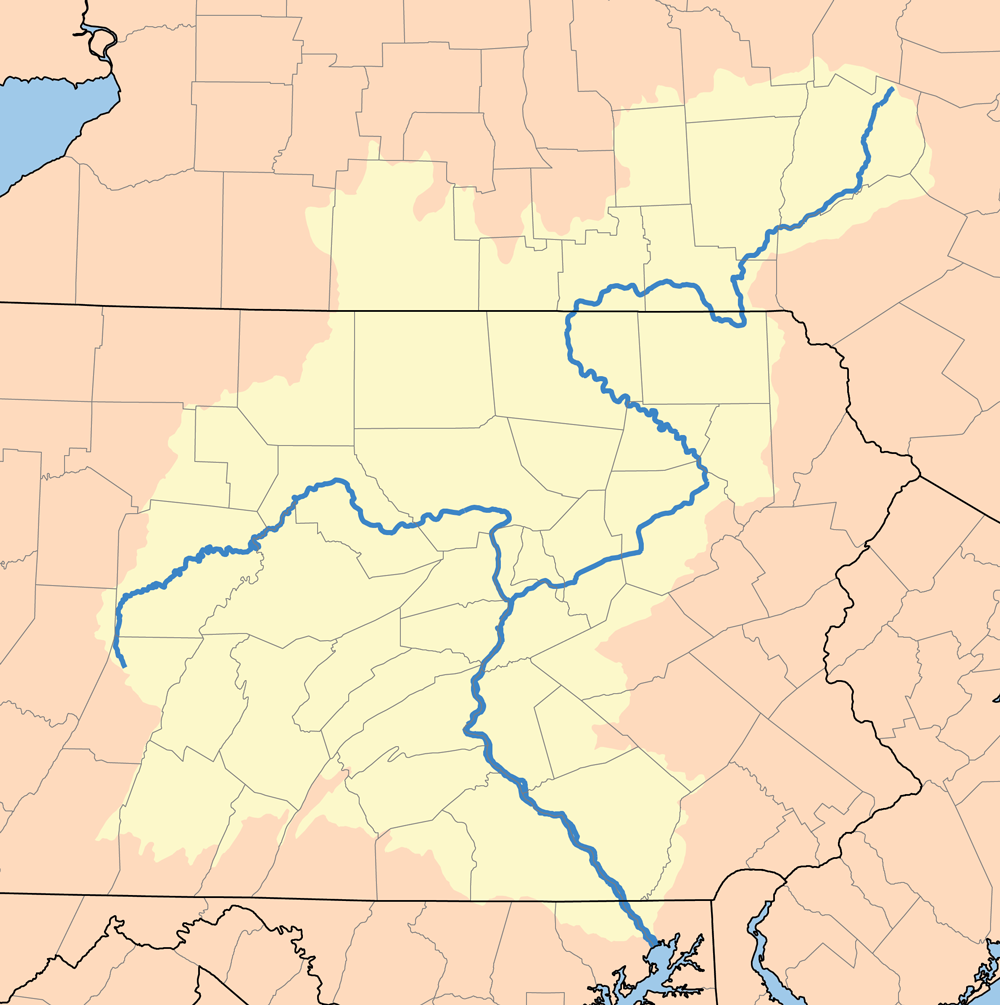
The Susquehanna River drainage basin

- Susquehanna River
  - Deer Creek
  - Octoraro Creek
    - West Branch Octoraro Creek
      - Stewart Run
    - East Branch Octoraro Creek
      - Muddy Run
  - Conowingo Creek
  - Fishing Creek (Lancaster County)
  - Muddy Creek (Susquehanna River tributary)
    - North Branch Muddy Creek
    - South Branch Muddy Creek
  - Tucquan Creek
  - Otter Creek
  - Pequea Creek
    - Big Beaver Creek
    - Little Beaver Creek
  - Conestoga River
    - Little Conestoga Creek
    - Mill Creek
    - Lititz Run
    - Cocalico Creek
      - Hammer Creek
      - Middle Creek
      - Indian Run
      - Little Cocalico Creek
    - Muddy Creek (Conestoga River tributary)
      - Little Muddy Creek
  - Fishing Creek (York County)
  - Cabin Creek
  - Kreutz Creek
  - Chiques Creek (known as Chickies Creek until 2002)
    - Donegal Creek
    - Little Chiques Creek
  - Codorus Creek
    - South Branch Codorus Creek
      - East Branch Codorus Creek
      - Centerville Creek
    - West Branch Codorus Creek
      - Oil Creek
  - Conoy Creek
  - Black Gut
  - Conewago Creek (west) (in Adams and York counties)
    - Little Conewago Creek (west)
    - Bennett Run
    - Beaver Creek (York County)
    - Beaver Creek (Adams County)
    - Bermudian Creek
      - Mud Run
      - North Branch Bermudian Creek
      - Latimore Creek
    - South Branch Conewago Creek
    - Beaverdam Creek
    - Opossum Creek
  - Conewago Creek (east) (in Lebanon, Dauphin, and Lancaster counties)
    - Lynch Run
    - Brills Run
    - Hoffer Creek
    - Little Conewago Creek (east)
  - Fishing Creek (Newberry Township)
  - Swatara Creek
    - Iron Run
    - Beaver Creek
    - Spring Creek
    - Manada Creek
    - Bow Creek
    - Quittapahilla Creek
      - Snitz Creek
      - Brandywine Creek (Quittapahilla Creek tributary)
    - Indiantown Run
    - Little Swatara Creek
      - Elizabeth Run
      - Crosskill Creek
    - Mill Creek
    - Lower Little Swatara Creek
    - Upper Little Swatara Creek
    - Good Spring Creek
  - Yellow Breeches Creek
    - Stony Run
    - Mountain Creek
  - Spring Creek
    - Slotznick Run
  - Paxton Creek
    - Asylum Run
    - Black Run
  - Conodoguinet Creek
    - Hogestown Run
    - LeTort Spring Run
    - Big Spring Creek
    - Doubling Gap Creek
    - Middle Spring Creek
    - Muddy Run (Conodoguinet Creek tributary)
      - Rowe Run
      - Lehman Run
    - Trout Run (Conodoguinet Creek tributary)
  - Fishing Creek (east bank Susquehanna River tributary)
  - Fishing Creek (Perry County) (west bank Susquehanna River tributary)
  - Stony Creek
    - Rattling Run
    - Rausch Creek
  - Clark Creek
  - Shermans Creek
    - Laurel Run
    - Bixler's Run
  - Little Juniata Creek

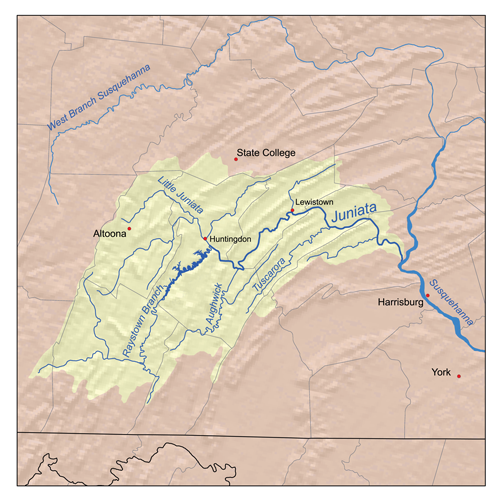
The Juniata River drainage basin

  - Juniata River
    - Little Buffalo Creek
    - Buffalo Creek
    - Wildcat Run
    - Cocolamus Creek
    - Delaware Creek
    - Raccoon Creek
    - Doe Run
    - Tuscarora Creek
      - East Licking Creek
      - Horse Valley Run
      - Willow Run
        - Dougherty Run
      - Narrows Branch Tuscarora Creek
    - Lost Creek
    - Jacks Creek
    - Kishacoquillas Creek
      - Tea Creek
      - Honey Creek
        - Laurel Creek
        - Treaster Run
          - Havice Creek
      - Little Kishacoquillas Creek
    - West Licking Creek
    - Aughwick Creek
      - Blacklog Creek
        - Shade Creek
      - Three Springs Creek
      - Little Aughwick Creek
        - North Branch Little Aughwick Creek
        - South Branch Little Aughwick Creek
      - Sideling Hill Creek
        - Wooden Bridge Creek
        - Roaring Run
    - Mill Creek
      - Saddler Creek
    - Raystown Branch Juniata River
      - Great Trough Creek
        - Little Trough Creek
      - Shoup Run
      - Yellow Creek
      - Brush Creek (Raystown Branch Juniata River tributary)
        - Shaffer Creek
          - Brush Creek (Shaffer Creek tributary)
          - Chapman Run
      - Clear Creek
      - Bloody Run
      - Cove Creek
      - Dunning Creek
        - Bobs Creek
      - Shobers Run
      - Buffalo Run
        - Milligan Run
      - Shawnee Branch
    - Standing Stone Creek
      - Herod Run
      - Murray Run
      - East Branch Standing Stone Creek
      - Laurel Run
    - Crooked Creek
    - Shaver Creek
    - Little Juniata River
      - Spruce Creek
        - Warriors Mark Run
      - Sinking Run
      - Bald Eagle Creek
      - Bells Gap Run
    - Frankstown Branch Juniata River
      - Clover Creek
        - Snare Run
      - Piney Creek
      - Canoe Creek
      - Beaverdam Branch Juniata River
        - Brush Run
        - Blair Gap Run
        - Sugar Run
        - Burgoon Run
        - Mill Run
      - Halter Creek
  - Powell Creek
  - Armstrong Creek
  - Hunters Run
  - Wiconisco Creek
    - Little Wiconisco Creek
    - Rattling Creek
  - Shippens Run
  - Bargers Run
    - Barger Run
      - Toad Hollow
    - Spruce Run
  - Mahantango Creek
    - Deep Creek
    - Snow Creek
    - Pine Creek
      - Deep Creek
        - Hans Yost Creek
      - Rausch Creek
        - East Branch Rausch Creek
        - West Branch Rausch Creek
    - Little Mahantango Creek
  - Boyers Run
  - Mahantango Creek
    - North Branch Mahantango Creek
      - Aline Creek
    - West Branch Mahantango Creek
      - Dobson Run
      - Leiningers Run
      - Quaker Run
  - Hoffer Creek
  - Dalmatia Creek
  - Independence Run
  - Chapman Creek
  - Herrold Run
  - Silver Creek
  - Fidlers Run
  - Mahanoy Creek
    - Schwaben Creek
      - Mouse Creek
      - Middle Creek
    - Zerbe Run
    - Crab Run
    - Little Mahanoy Creek
      - Rattling Run
    - Shenandoah Creek
      - Lost Creek
      - Kehly Run
    - North Mahanoy Creek
  - Penns Creek
    - Middle Creek
      - Susquehecka Creek
        - Dry Run
      - Kern Run
        - Wetzel Run
        - Luphers Run
      - Beaver Creek
    - Pine Creek
    - Elk Creek
    - Sinking Creek
      - Potter Run
  - Boile Run
  - Hallowing Run
  - Sealholtz Run
  - Rolling Green Run
  - Shamokin Creek
    - Little Shamokin Creek
      - Plum Creek
    - Lick Creek
    - Millers Run
    - Bennys Run
    - Trout Run
    - Furnace Run
    - Carbon Run
    - Coal Run
    - Quaker Run
    - Locust Creek
    - North Branch Shamokin Creek
  - West Branch Susquehanna River
    - Winfield Creek
    - Turtle Creek
    - Chillisquaque Creek
      - Beaver Run
      - Mud Creek (Chillisquaque Creek tributary)
      - West Branch Chillisquaque Creek
        - County Line Branch
        - McKee Run
        - Beaver Run
      - East Branch Chillisquaque Creek
        - White Hall Creek
      - Middle Branch Chillisquaque Creek
    - Buffalo Creek
      - Little Buffalo Creek
      - Spruce Run
        - Muddy Run
        - Black Run
      - Beaver Run
      - Stony Run
      - Rapid Run
        - Halfway Run
        - Yankee Run
      - North Branch Buffalo Creek
        - Coal Run
        - Panther Run
          - Slide Hollow
    - Limestone Run (Montour and Northumberland Counties, Pennsylvania)
    - Muddy Run
    - Warrior Run
    - White Deer Creek
      - Lick Run
      - Mile Run
      - Sand Spring Run
      - Cowbell Hollow
      - Tunis Run
    - Spring Run
    - Dry Run
    - Delaware Run
    - White Deer Hole Creek
      - Spring Creek
      - Beartrap Hollow
    - Black Run
    - Black Hole Creek
    - Turkey Run
    - Glade Run
    - Muncy Creek
      - Wolf Run
        - Oak Run
      - Little Muncy Creek
        - Cox Run
        - Shepman Run
        - Laurel Run
        - Broad Run
        - German Run
        - Jakes Run
        - Derr Run
        - Big Run
        - Beaver Run
          - Marsh Run
        - Little Indian Run
        - West Branch Little Muncy Creek
          - West Creek
        - Buck Run
    - Loyalsock Creek
      - Mill Creek
      - Wallis Run
      - Bear Creek
      - Plunketts Creek
      - Elk Creek
        - Hoagland Branch
        - Kings Creek
      - Little Loyalsock Creek
        - Black Creek
      - Birch Creek
      - Lopez Creek
      - Pigeon Creek
    - Lycoming Creek
      - Hoagland Run
      - Pleasant Stream
      - Rock Run
      - Roaring Branch
    - Larrys Creek
    - Rauchtown Run/Antes Creek
    - Pine Creek
      - Little Pine Creek
        - Texas Creek
          - Hughes Run
          - Zimmerman Creek
        - Blockhouse Creek
          - Blacks Creek
      - Slate Run
      - Cedar Run
      - Babb Creek
        - Stony Fork Creek
      - Marsh Creek
      - West Branch Pine Creek
        - Lyman Run
      - Genesee Forks
    - Bald Eagle Creek
      - Fishing Creek
        - Little Fishing Creek
      - Beech Creek
      - Marsh Creek
      - Spring Creek
        - Buffalo Run
        - Logan Branch
        - Slab Cabin Run
        - Spring Creek
      - Wallace Run
    - Lick Run
    - Tangascootack Creek
      - North Fork Tangascootack Creek
    - Hyner Run
    - Young Womans Creek
    - Drury Run
    - Kettle Creek
      - Twomile Run
        - Middle Branch Twomile Run
        - Huling Branch
      - Hammersley Fork
      - Little Kettle Creek
      - Cross Fork
    - Fish Dam Run
      - Dennison Fork
    - Cooks Run
      - Lick Run
    - Sinnemahoning Creek
      - First Fork Sinnemahoning Creek
        - Bailey Run
        - East Fork Sinnemahoning Creek
        - Freeman Run
      - Bennett Branch
        - Hicks Run
        - Dents Run
        - Trout Run
        - Medix Run
        - Laurel Run
      - Driftwood Branch
        - Sinnemahoning Portage Creek
        - West Creek
        - North Creek
        - Clear Creek
    - Birch Island Run
    - Mosquito Creek
      - Gifford Run
    - Moshannon Creek
      - Black Moshannon Creek
      - Cold Stream
    - Deer Creek
    - Trout Run
    - Lick Run
      - Flegals Run
      - Jerrys Run
      - Fork Run
      - Stone Run (Lick Run tributary)
    - Clearfield Creek
      - Little Clearfield Creek
        - Gazzam Run
        - Watts Creek
    - Anderson Creek
      - Kratzer Run
        - Bilger Run
          - Fenton Run
          - Hughey Run
      - Bear Run
      - Little Anderson Creek
      - Panther Run
      - Irvin Branch
      - Montgomery Run
        - Burns Run
        - Coupler Run
      - Dressler Run
      - Blanchard Run
      - Stony Run
        - Whitney Run
    - Chest Creek
    - Bear Run
    - Cush Creek
  - Lithia Springs Creek
    - Johnson Creek
  - Gravel Run
  - Packers Run
  - Raups Run
  - Kipps Run
    - Wilson Run
  - Gaskins Run
  - Mahoning Creek (Susquehanna River tributary)
    - Sechler Run
      - Blizzards Run
    - Kase Run
    - Mauses Creek
      - Indian Creek
  - Toby Run
  - Logan Run
  - Little Roaring Creek
  - Roaring Creek
    - South Branch Roaring Creek
      - Mugser Run
    - Lick Run
    - Mill Creek
  - Catawissa Creek
    - Furnace Run
    - Scotch Run
    - Fisher Run
    - Mine Gap Run
    - Beaver Run
    - Long Hollow
    - Stranger Hollow
    - Klingermans Run
    - Cranberry Run
    - Crooked Run
    - Tomhicken Creek
      - Raccoon Creek
      - Little Crooked Run
      - Sugarloaf Creek
      - Little Tomhicken Creek
    - Little Catawissa Creek
      - Stony Run
      - Trexler Run
    - Dark Run
    - Rattling Run
    - Davis Run
    - Messers Run
      - Negro Hollow
    - Spies Run
    - Cross Run
    - Hunkydory Creek
  - Corn Run
  - Fishing Creek
    - Montour Run
    - Hemlock Creek
      - Frozen Run
      - West Hemlock Creek
    - Little Fishing Creek
      - Spruce Run
      - West Branch Run
        - Shingle Run
      - Lick Run
      - Wolfhouse Run
      - Devil Hole Run
      - Little Brier Run
    - Stony Brook (Fishing Creek tributary)
    - Deerlick Run
    - Green Creek
      - Mud Run
      - Rickard Hollow
      - Little Green Creek
    - Huntington Creek
      - Pine Creek
        - Little Pine Creek
        - Bell Creek
        - Wasp Branch
        - Brish Run
      - Kingsbury Brook
      - Rogers Creek
        - Marsh Creek
        - Black Ash Creek
      - Marshall Hollow
      - Kitchen Creek
        - Maple Run
        - Crooked Creek
        - Boston Run
        - Maple Spring Brook
        - Shingle Cabin Brook
      - Phillips Creek
      - Lick Branch
      - Arnold Creek
      - Shingle Run
      - Laurel Run
      - Mitchler Run
    - Raven Creek
      - East Branch Raven Creek
        - Stine Hollow
    - West Creek
      - Spencer Run
      - York Hollow
    - Coles Creek
      - Hess Hollow
      - Fallow Hollow
      - Ashelman Run
      - Marsh Run
      - Chimneystack Run
    - West Branch Fishing Creek
      - Rough Run
      - Peterman Run
      - Elk Run
        - Long Run
        - Hog Run
        - Gallows Run
      - Bloody Run
      - Painter Run
        - Oxhorn Run
      - Big Run
      - Shingle Mill Run
        - Bearwallow Run
      - Deep Hollow
      - Laurel Run
      - Hemlock Run
      - Slip Run
      - Swanks Run
    - East Branch Fishing Creek
      - Blackberry Run
      - Trout Run
      - Lead Run
      - Heberly Run
        - Quinn Run
          - Shanty Run
        - Meeker Run
      - Big Run
      - Sullivan Branch
        - Pigeon Run
        - Hunts Run
        - Ore Run
  - Kinney Run
  - Tenmile Run
  - Briar Creek
    - East Branch Briar Creek
      - Glen Brook
      - Kashinka Hollow
    - West Branch Briar Creek
      - Fester Hollow
      - Cabin Run
  - Nescopeck Creek
    - Black Creek
      - Scotch Run
      - Falls Run
      - Barnes Run
      - Stony Creek (Black Creek tributary)
        - Cranberry Creek
        - Wolffs Run
      - Little Black Creek
    - Little Nescopeck Creek
    - Long Run (Nescopeck Creek tributary)
    - Oley Creek
      - Long Hollow (Oley Creek tributary)
    - Little Nescopeck Creek
      - Conety Run
    - Creasy Creek
      - Reilly Creek
        - Mill Creek
  - Salem Creek
  - Walker Run
  - Big Wapwallopen Creek
    - Balliet Run
    - Watering Run
    - Bow Creek
  - Little Wapwallopen Creek
    - Pond Creek
    - Nuangola Outlet
  - Rocky Run
  - Turtle Creek
  - Black Creek
  - Paddy Run
  - Shickshinny Creek
    - Little Shickshinny Creek
    - Reyburn Creek
    - Culver Creek
  - Hunlock Creek
    - Roaring Brook
      - Lewis Run
  - Harveys Creek
    - East Fork Harveys Creek
      - Drakes Creek
    - Pikes Creek
      - Fades Creek
    - Paint Spring Run
    - Bear Hollow Creek
  - Newport Creek
    - South Branch Newport Creek
      - Reservoir Creek
    - Middle Branch Newport Creek
    - Northbranch Newport Creek
  - Nanticoke Creek
    - Espy Run
  - Warrior Creek
  - Solomon Creek
    - Spring Run
    - Sugar Notch Run
    - Pine Creek
  - Toby Creek
    - Huntsville Creek
      - Browns Creek
    - Trout Brook
  - Mill Creek
    - Laurel Run
      - Deep Hollow
    - Gardner Creek
      - Lampblack Creek
      - Three Spring Brook
    - Deep Creek
    - Rough Hollow
    - Warden Creek
  - Abrahams Creek

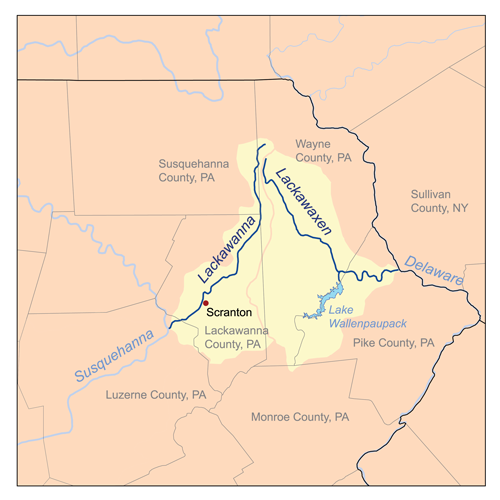
The Lackawanna and Lackawaxen drainage basins

  - Lackawanna River
    - Red Spring Run
    - Saint Johns Creek
    - Mill Creek
      - Lidy Creek
      - Collins Creek
    - Spring Brook
      - Covey Swamp Creek
      - Monument Creek
        - Trout Creek
      - Green Run
      - Rattlesnake Creek
        - Six Springs Creek
      - Plank Bridge Creek
      - Panther Creek
        - Painter Creek
    - Keyser Creek
      - Lindy Creek
      - Lucky Run
    - Stafford Meadow Brook
    - Roaring Brook
      - Little Roaring Brook
      - Rock Bottom Creek
      - White Oak Run
      - Kellum Creek
      - Van Brunt Creek
        - Langan Creek
      - Bear Brook
      - East Branch Roaring Brook
      - Lake Run
        - Emerson Run
    - Meadow Brook
    - Leggetts Creek
      - Leach Creek
        - South Branch Leach Creek
      - Clover Hill Creek
      - Summit Lake Creek
    - Price Creek
      - Pancoast Creek
    - Eddy Creek
    - Hull Creek
    - Wildcat Creek
      - West Branch Tinklepaugh Creek
    - Sterry Creek
    - Grassy Island Creek
    - Laurel Run
    - White Oak Run
      - Indian Cave Creek
    - Aylesworth Creek
    - Callender Gap Creek
    - Rush Brook
    - Powderly Creek
    - Lees Creek
    - Meredith Creek
    - Fall Brook
    - Racket Brook
    - Coal Brook
    - Wilson Creek
    - Rogers Brook
    - Clarks Creek
    - Meredith Brook
    - Brace Brook
    - East Branch Lackawanna River
    - West Branch Lackawanna River
      - Fiddle Lake Creek
  - Hicks Creek
  - Obendoffers Creek
  - Gardner Creek
  - Lewis Creek
  - Sutton Creek
    - Cider Run
  - Bowman Creek
    - Benson Hollow
    - Sugar Hollow Creek
    - Marsh Creek
      - Sugar Run
    - Roaring Run
      - Newton Run
      - South Branch Roaring Run
    - Leonard Creek
    - South Run
    - Beaver Run
    - Hettesheimer Run
    - York Run
    - Stone Run
    - Sorber Run
    - Baker Run
      - Windfall Run
    - Broad Hollow Run
    - Sugar Run
    - Cider Run
    - Butternut Run
    - Beth Run
    - Wolf Run
    - Bean Run
    - North Branch Bowman Creek
    - South Branch Bowman Creek
      - Cherry Run
  - Tunkhannock Creek
    - Swale Brook
    - Billings Mill Brook
      - Kern Glen Creek
    - South Branch Tunkhannock Creek
      - Trout Brook
      - Ackerly Creek
      - Kennedy Creek
    - Oxbow Creek
      - Horton Creek
      - Oxbow Inlet
    - Monroe Creek
    - Field Brook
      - East Branch Field Brook
    - Horton Creek
    - Martins Creek
      - Hop Bottom Creek
      - Dry Creek
      - East Branch Martins Creek
    - Utley Brook
      - Willow Brook
    - East Branch Tunkhannock Creek
      - Idlewild Creek
      - Dundaff Creek
      - Tinker Creek
      - Little Creek
        - Tinker Hollow
    - Millard Creek
    - Tower Branch
    - Partners Creek
    - Nine Partners Creek
      - Butler Creek
        - Little Butler Creek
      - Leslie Creek
    - Bell Creek
    - Bear Swamp Creek
    - Rock Creek
  - Taques Creek
  - Mehoopany Creek
    - Fox Hollow
    - Rogers Hollow
    - North Branch Mehoopany Creek
      - Farr Hollow
      - Douglas Hollow
      - Burgess Brook
      - Miller Brook
      - Catlin Brook
      - Sciota Brook
      - Barnes Brook
        - Coffee Brook
      - Smith Cabin Run
      - Wolf Run
    - Bowman Hollow
    - White Brook
    - Scouten Brook
    - Kasson Brook
    - Henry Lott Brook
    - Stony Brook
      - Red Brook
    - Somer Brook
    - Becker Brook
    - South Brook
      - Opossum Brook
    - Bellas Brook
    - Cherry Ridge Run
  - Little Mehoopany Creek
  - Meshoppen Creek
    - Little Meshoppen Creek
    - West Branch Meshoppen Creek
      - Riley Creek
        - Baker Creek
        - Dority Creek
        - Nick Creek
      - White Creek
        - West Creek
    - North Branch Meshoppen Creek
    - Thomas Creek
      - Negro Hollow
    - Pond Brook
    - Stevens Creek
    - Burdick Creek
  - Tuscarora Creek
  - Sugar Run Creek
    - Sugar Run
  - Wyalusing Creek
    - North Branch Wyalusing Creek
      - Gaylord Creek
    - East Branch Wyalusing Creek
  - Wysox Creek
  - Towanda Creek
    - South Branch Towanda Creek
    - Schrader Creek
  - Sugar Creek
  - Chemung River
    - Bentley Creek
    - Seeley Creek
      - South Creek
      - Hammond Creek
    - Tioga River
      - Cowanesque River
        - Troups Creek
        - North Fork Cowanesque River
      - Crooked Creek
      - Mill Creek
      - Corey Creek
      - Elk Run
  - Cayuta Creek
  - Wappasening Creek
  - Apalachin Creek
  - Choconut Creek
  - Little Snake Creek
  - Snake Creek
  - Salt Lick Creek
  - Canawacta Creek
  - Starrucca Creek
    - Shadigee Creek

==== Potomac River ====
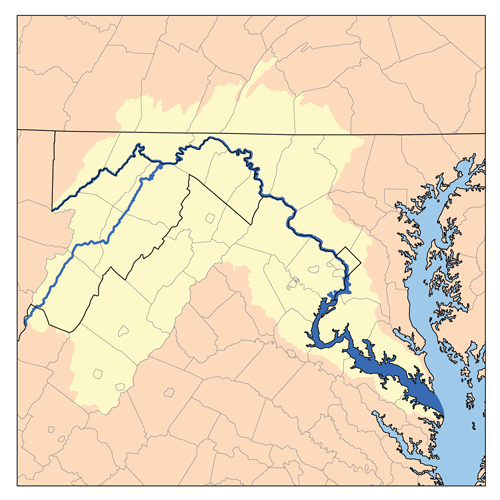
The Potomac River drainage basin

- Potomac River (MD)
  - Monocacy River (MD)
    - Toms Creek
      - Middle Creek
      - Flat Run
      - Friends Creek
      - Miney Branch
    - Piney Creek
    - Alloway Creek
    - Marsh Creek
      - Willoughby Run
        - Pitzer Run
    - Rock Creek
      - White Run
        - Plum Run
      - Plum Run
      - Guinn Run
      - Winebrenner Run
      - Stevens Run
      - Blocher's Run
  - Antietam Creek
    - Marsh Run
    - East Branch Antietam Creek
      - Red Run
    - West Branch Antietam Creek
  - Conococheague Creek
    - West Branch Conococheague Creek
      - Buck Run
      - Licking Creek
    - Back Creek
      - Dennis Creek
    - Falling Spring Branch
  - Little Conococheague Creek
  - Licking Creek
    - Little Cove Creek
    - Big Cove Creek
    - Patterson Run
  - Tonoloway Creek
    - Little Tonoloway Creek
  - Sideling Hill Creek
  - Town Creek
    - Flintstone Creek
    - Sweet Root Creek
    - Elk Lick Creek
  - North Branch Potomac River (MD)
    - Evitts Creek
    - Wills Creek
      - Gladdens Run
      - Little Wills Creek
      - Brush Creek

=== Gulf of Mexico ===
(via the Mississippi River)

==== Ohio River ====
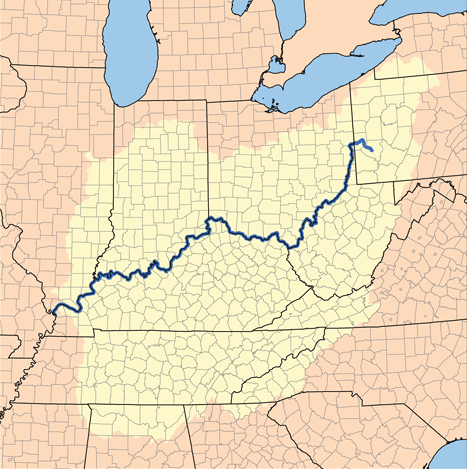
The Ohio River drainage basin

- Ohio River
  - Fish Creek
    - Pennsylvania Fork Fish Creek
  - Flaugherty Run
    - Spring Run
  - Wheeling Creek
    - Enlow Fork
      - Robinson Fork
      - Templeton Fork
    - Dunkard Fork
      - North Fork Dunkard Fork
      - South Fork Dunkard Fork
  - Buffalo Creek
    - Castleman Run
    - Welch Run
    - Dog Run
    - Dutch Fork
      - Ralston Run
      - Bonar Creek
    - Narigan Run
    - Brush Run
      - Dunkle Run
        - Hanen Run
    - Buck Run
    - Wolf Run
    - Sawhill Run
  - Cross Creek (Ohio River tributary)
    - Scott Run
      - Parmar Run
    - North Fork Cross Creek
      - Middle Fork Cross Creek
    - Haynan Creek
    - South Fork Cross Creek
  - Harmon Creek
    - Paris Run
    - Ward Run
  - Kings Creek
    - North Fork Kings Creek
    - Aunt Clara Fork
      - Lawrence Run
  - Little Beaver Creek
    - North Fork Little Beaver Creek
  - Raccoon Creek
  - Beaver River
    - McKinley Run
    - Hamilton Run
    - Brady Run
    - Walnut Bottom Run
    - Bennett Run
    - Wallace Run
    - Thompson Run
    - Clarks Run
    - Stockman Run
    - Connoquenessing Creek
      - Slippery Rock Creek
        - Skunk Run
        - Hell Run
        - Grindstone Run
        - Cheeseman Run
        - Muddy Creek
        - Taylor Run
        - Jamison Run
        - Black Run
        - Wolf Creek
        - Hogue Run
        - Big Run
        - Glade Run
        - Long Run
        - McDonald Run
        - South Branch Slippery Rock Creek
        - McMurray Run
        - North Branch of Slippery Rock Creek
        - Blacks Creek
        - Seaton Creek
      - Brush Creek
      - Camp Run
      - Scholars Run
      - Little Connoquenessing Creek
      - Breakneck Creek
        - Likens Run
        - Wolfe Run
        - Kaufman Run
      - Glade Run
        - South Branch Glade Run
      - Thorn Creek
      - Sullivan Run
      - Bonnie Brook
    - Wampum Run
    - Snake Run
    - Eckles Run
    - Jenkins Run
    - Edwards Run
    - McKee Run
    - Mahoning River
      - Hickory Run
    - Shenango River
      - Neshannock Creek
        - Hottenbaugh Run
        - Little Neshannock Creek
          - West Branch Little Neshannock Creek
        - Potter Run
        - Indian Run
        - Hunters Run
        - Mill Run
        - Pine Run
        - Beaver Run
        - Otter Creek
        - Cool Spring Creek
          - Yellow Creek
      - Pymatuning Creek
      - Little Shenango River
        - Crooked Creek
      - Linesville Creek
  - Chartiers Creek
    - Whiskey Run
    - Campbells Run
    - Robinson Run
    - Scrubgrass Run
    - Painters Run
    - McLaughlin Run
    - Thoms Run
    - Millers Run
    - Coal Run
    - Brush Run
    - McPherson Creek
    - Little Chartiers Creek
    - Brush Run
    - Chartiers Run
      - Plum Run
      - Westland Run
    - Georges Run
    - Catfish Creek

===== Allegheny River =====
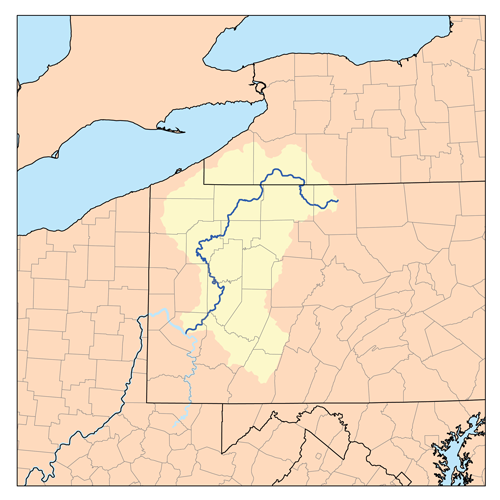
The Allegheny River drainage basin

  - Allegheny River
    - Girtys Run
    - Pine Creek
    - Squaw Run
    - Plum Creek
    - Deer Creek
    - Riddle Run
    - Richey Run
    - Pucketa Creek
      - Little Pucketa Creek
    - Bull Creek
      - Little Bull Creek
      - McDowell Run
      - Lardintown Run
      - Rocky Run
    - Chartiers Run
    - Rachel Carson Run
    - Buffalo Creek
      - Little Buffalo Creek
      - Cornplanter Run
      - Patterson Creek
    - Kiskiminetas River
      - Carnahan Run
      - Beaver Run
      - Blacklegs Creek
      - Loyalhanna Creek
        - Four Mile Run
        - Mill Creek
      - Conemaugh River
        - Blacklick Creek
          - Two Lick Creek
            - Yellow Creek
              - Little Yellow Creek
          - North Branch Blacklick Creek
          - South Branch Blacklick Creek
        - McGhee Run
        - Tubmill Creek
          - Hendricks Creek
        - Little Conemaugh River
          - South Fork Little Conemaugh River
        - Stonycreek River
          - Bens Creek
          - Paint Creek
          - Shade Creek
            - Clear Shade Creek
            - Dark Shade Creek
          - Quemahoning Creek
    - Glade Run
    - Crooked Creek
      - Plum Creek
        - North Branch Plum Creek
        - South Branch Plum Creek
        - McKee Run
    - Cowanshannock Creek
    - Pine Creek
    - Mahoning Creek
      - Canoe Creek
      - Pine Run
      - Little Mahoning Creek
      - Stump Creek
      - East Branch Mahoning Creek
    - Redbank Creek
      - Little Sandy Creek
      - North Fork Creek
      - Sandy Lick Creek
        - Mill Creek
    - Bear Creek
      - Silver Creek
      - South Branch Bear Creek
      - North Branch Bear Creek
    - Clarion River
      - Toms Run (Clarion River tributary)
      - Turkey Run
      - Canoe Creek
      - Licking Creek
      - Deer Creek
        - Paint Creek
      - Piney Creek
      - Toby Creek
      - Mill Creek
      - Millstone Creek
      - Spring Creek
      - Little Toby Creek
      - Bear Creek
      - Big Mill Creek
      - Elk Creek
      - Little Mill Creek
      - East Branch Clarion River
      - West Branch Clarion River
    - Scrubgrass Creek
      - Bullion Run
      - Gilmore Run
    - Little Scrubgrass Creek
      - Lockard Run
    - Whann Run
    - Sandy Creek
      - South Sandy Creek
      - Little Sandy Creek
    - East Sandy Creek
      - Shaw Run
      - Halls Run
    - French Creek
      - Sugar Creek
        - Lake Creek
        - East Branch Sugar Creek
      - North Deer Creek
      - Little Creek
      - Conneaut Outlet
        - Rock Creek
        - Williams Run
        - Watson Run
        - McMichael Run
        - Mud Run
        - Adsit Run
        - Barber Run
      - Van Horne Creek
      - Cussewago Creek
      - Bennyhoof Creek
        - Spring Run
        - Carr Run
          - Rundelltown Creek
        - West Branch Cussewago Creek
      - Gravel Run
      - Woodcock Creek
      - Conneauttee Creek
        - Little Conneauttee Creek
        - Torry Run
        - Darrows Creek
        - Shenango Creek
      - Mohawk Run
      - Muddy Creek
        - Dead Creek
        - Mackey Run
        - Federal Run
        - Navy Run
      - LeBoeuf Creek
      - South Branch French Creek
        - Horton Run
        - Bentley Run
        - Pine Run
        - Hungry Run
        - Lilley Run
        - Beaver Run
        - Slaughter Run
        - Baskin Run
        - Spencer Creek
      - Alder Run
      - West Branch French Creek
        - Bailey Brook
        - Alder Brook
        - Townley Run
        - Darrow Brook
      - Hubbel Run
    - Brannon Run
    - Charley Run
    - Oil Creek
      - Cornplanter Run
      - Cherry Run
      - Cherrytree Run
      - Benninghof Run
      - Pine Creek
        - Caldwell Creek
          - Porky Run
          - Stony Hollow Run
          - West Branch Caldwell Creek
          - Dunderdale Creek
        - Henderson Run
      - Church Run
      - Thompson Creek
        - McLaughlin Creek
        - Shirley Run
          - Dolly Run
        - Hummer Creek
      - East Branch Oil Creek
      - Mosey Run
      - East Shreve Run
      - West Shreve Run
    - Pithole Creek
    - Hemlock Creek
    - Tionesta Creek
      - Coon Creek
      - Salmon Creek
      - West Branch Tionesta Creek
      - South Branch Tionesta Creek
    - East Hickory Creek
    - Tidioute Creek
    - Brokenstraw Creek
      - Irvine Run
      - McKinney Run
      - Indian Camp Run
      - Matthews Run
      - Mead Run
      - Andrews Run
      - Little Brokenstraw Creek
      - Blue Eye Run
      - Gar Run
      - Spring Creek
      - Damon Run
      - Hare Creek
      - Coffee Creek
    - Conewango Creek
      - Stillwater Creek
      - Chadakoin River
    - Kinzua Creek
      - Chappel Fork
      - South Branch Kinzua Creek
    - Sugar Run
    - Tunungwant Creek
      - Latchaw Creek
      - Foster Brook
        - Harrisburg Run
        - Pennbrook Run
      - Bolivar Run
      - Kendall Creek
        - Lafferty Run
      - East Branch Tunungwant Creek
        - Rutherford Run
        - Minard Run
        - Sheppard Run
        - Watrous Run
        - Foster Run
      - West Branch Tunungwant Creek
        - Bennett Brook
        - Marilla Brook
          - Gilbert Run
        - Langmade Brook
        - Fuller Brook
        - South Penn Run
        - Kissem Run
        - Two Mile Run
    - Knapp Creek
    - Barden Brook
    - Oswayo Creek
      - Little Genesee Creek
      - Honeoye Creek
    - Potato Creek
      - Marvin Creek
    - Allegheny Portage Creek

===== Monongahela River =====
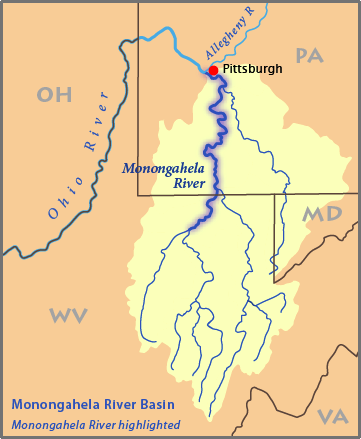
The Monongahela River drainage basin

  - Monongahela River
    - Four Mile Run
      - Panther Hollow Run
        - Phipps Run
    - Becks Run
    - Streets Run
      - Glass Run
    - West Run
    - Ninemile Run
    - Turtle Creek
      - Brush Creek
        - Bushy Run
    - Thompson Run
    - Crooked Run
    - Youghiogheny River
      - Long Run
      - Crawford Run
      - Rock Run
      - Gillespie Run
      - Pollock Run
      - Sewickley Creek
        - Little Sewickley Creek
        - Kelly Run
        - Hunters Run
        - Pinkerton Run
        - Lick Run
        - Buffalo Run
        - Belson Run
        - Wilson Run
        - Jacks Run
        - Township Line Run
        - Boyer Run
        - Brinker Run
        - Welty Run
      - Cedar Creek
      - Jacobs Creek
        - Barren Run
        - Meadow Creek
        - Stauffer Run
        - Sherrick Run
        - Shupe Run
        - Brush Run
        - Laurel Run
      - Browneller Run
      - Washington Run
      - Virgin Run
      - Furnace Run
      - Smiley Run
      - Dickerson Run
      - Hickman Run
      - Galley Run
      - Mounts Creek
      - Connell Run
      - Dunbar Creek
      - Laurel Run
      - Indian Creek
      - Morgan Run
      - Workman Run
      - Johnson Run
      - Bruner Run
      - Crooked Run
      - Sugar Run
      - Jonathan Run
      - Bear Run
      - Stulls Run
      - Jim Run
      - Cucumber Run
      - Meadow Run
      - Sheepskin Run
      - Rock Spring Run
      - Lick Run
      - Camp Run
      - Drake Run
      - Ramcat Run
      - Casselman River
        - Laurel Hill Creek
        - Coxes Creek
        - Buffalo Creek
        - Flaugherty Creek
      - Hen Run
      - Tub Run
      - Hall Run
      - Braddocks Run
      - Reason Run
    - Lewis Run (Monongahela River tributary)
    - Peters Creek
      - Lewis Run (Peters Creek tributary)
      - Beam Run
      - Lick Run
      - Piney Fork
    - Wylie Run
    - Fallen Timber Run
    - Lobbs Run
    - Kelly Run (Monongahela River tributary)
    - Bunola Run
    - Houston Run
    - Mingo Creek
    - Dry Run
    - Pigeon Creek
    - Beckets Run
    - Maple Creek
    - Speers Run
    - Hooders Run
    - Little Redstone Creek
    - Redstone Creek
    - Dunlap Creek
    - Tenmile Creek
      - South Fork Tenmile Creek
        - Castile Run
        - Browns Run
        - Ruff Creek
        - Coal Lick Run
        - Grimes Run
        - Laurel Run
        - Sugar Run
        - Jackson Run
        - Purman Run
        - Smith Creek
        - Toll Gate Run
        - Browns Creek
        - Throckmorton Run
        - Clear Run
        - Pursley Creek
        - Rush Run
        - Lightner Run
        - Hargus Creek
        - West Run
        - Scott Run
        - Morris Run
      - Plum Run
      - Barrs Run
      - Daniels Run
    - Rush Run
    - Bates Run
    - Pumpkin Run
    - Muddy Creek
    - Wallace Run
    - Antram Run
    - Middle Run
    - Browns Run
    - Little Whiteley Creek
    - Whiteley Creek
    - Cats Run
    - Jacobs Creek
    - Georges Creek
      - War Branch
      - York Run
      - Mountain Creek
      - Muddy Run
    - Dunkard Creek
      - Rocky Hollow
      - Meadow Run
        - Roberts Run
        - Bell Run
      - Glade Run
      - Dooley Run
      - Calvin Run
        - Watkins Run
        - North Branch Calvin Run
      - Hobbs Run
      - Bacon Run
    - Cheat River
      - Big Sandy Creek
        - Tebolt Run
        - Quebec Run
        - McIntire Run
        - Scotts Run
        - Chaney Run
        - Braddock Run
        - Little Sandy Creek
    - Camp Run

=== Lake Erie ===
- Twentymile Creek
- Sixteenmile Creek
- Twelvemile Creek
- Eightmile Creek
  - Scott Run
- Sevenmile Creek
  - Elliotts Run
- Sixmile Creek
- Fourmile Creek
- Mill Creek
- Walnut Creek
  - Bear Run
- Trout Run
- Elk Creek
  - Little Elk Creek
  - Lamson Run
- Crooked Creek
- Raccoon Creek
- Turkey Creek
- Conneaut Creek
  - East Branch Conneaut Creek
    - Temple Creek
  - West Branch Conneaut Creek

=== Lake Ontario ===
- Genesee River
  - Cryder Creek

== Alphabetically ==
This List Is Arranged Alphabetically

A

- Abrahams Creek
- Ackerly Creek
- Allegheny Creek
- Allegheny River
- Aline Creek
- Alloway Creek
- Alder Run
- Alder Brook
- Antietam Creek (Schuylkill River)
- Antietam Creek (Potomac River)
- Angelica Creek
- Anderson Creek
- Aquashicola Creek
- Aquetong Creek
- Arnold Creek
- Armstrong Creek
- Ashelman Run
- Asylum Run
- Aughwick Creek
- Aunt Clara Fork

B

- Babb Creek
- Back Creek
- Bacon Run
- Bailey Brook
- Baker Run
- Bald Eagle Creek (Little Juniata River)
- Bald Eagle Creek (West Branch Susquehanna River)
- Balliet Run
- Bargers Run
- Barnes Brook
- Barnes Run
- Barren Run
- Barrs Run
- Baskin Run
- Bean Run
- Bear Brook
- Bear Creek (Allegheny River)
- Bear Creek (Lehigh River)
- Bear Creek (Loyalsock Creek)
- Bear Hollow Creek
- Bear Run (Anderson Creek)
- Bear Run (Youghiogheny River)
- Bear Swamp Creek
- Beartrap Hollow
- Beaver Creek (Lehigh River)
- Beaver Creek (Swatara Creek)
- Beaver Creek (Tinicum Creek)
- Beaver River
- Beaver Run (Bowman Creek)
- Beaver Run (Buffalo Creek)
- Beaver Run (Catawissa Creek)
- Beaver Run (Chillisquaque Creek)
- Beaver Run (County Line Branch)
- Beaver Run (Little Muncy Creek)
- Beaver Run (Neshannock Creek)
- Beaver Run (South Branch French Creek)
- Beaver Run (Tohickon Creek)
- Becker Brook
- Beech Creek
- Bellas Brook
- Bell Creek (Pine Creek)
- Bell Creek (Tunkhannock Creek)
- Bell Run
- Belson Run
- Bennett Branch
- Bennet Brook
- Bennett Run (Beaver River)
- Bennett Run (Conewago Creek)
- Benninghof Run
- Bennys Run
- Benson Hollow
- Bentley Run
- Bermudian Creek
- Beth Run
- Big Beaver Creek
- Big Bushkill Creek
- Big Cove Creek
- Big Elk Creek
- Big Run (East Branch Fishing Creek)
- Big Run (Little Muncy Creek)
- Big Run (Slippery Rock Creek)
- Big Run (West Branch Fishing Creek)
- Big Sandy Creek
- Big Spring Creek
- Biles Creek
- Bilger Run
- Billings Mill Brook
- Birch Island Run
- Black Ash Creek
- Blackberry Run
- Black Creek (Lehigh River)
- Black Creek (Nescopeck Creek)
- Black Creek (Susquehanna River)
- Black Ditch Creek
- Black Gut
- Black Hole Creek
- Blacklick Creek
- Blacklog Creek
- Black Moshannon Creek
- Black Run (Slippery Rock Creek)
- Black Run (Spruce Run)
- Black Run (West Branch Susquehanna River)
- Blacks Creek (Little Pine Creek)
- Blacks Creek (Slippery Rock Creek)
- Blacks Run
- Blanchard Run
- Blocher's Run
- Bloody Run (Poquessing Creek)
- Bloody Run (Raystown Branch Juniata River)
- Bloody Run (West Branch Fishing Creek)
- Blue Eye Run
- Bobs Creek
- Bogy Run
- Boile Run
- Bolivar Run
- Bonar Creek
- Boston Run
- Bow Creek (Big Wapwallopen Creek)
- Bow Creek (Swatara Creek)
- Bowman Creek
- Bowman Hollow
- Boyer Run
- Boyers Run
- Brace Brook
- Braddock Run
- Braddocks Run
- Brady Run
- Brandywine Creek (Christina River Tributary)
- Brandywine Creek (Quittapahilla Creek)
- Brannon Run (Allegheny River)
- Brannon Run (East Branch Oil Creek)
- Breakneck Creek
- Briar Creek
- Bridge Creek
- Brinker Run
- Brish Run
- Broad Hollow Run
- Broad Run (Little Muncy Creek)
- Broad Run (White Clay Creek)
- Brock Creek
- Brodhead Creek
- Brokenstraw Creek
- Browneller Run
- Browns Creek
- Browns Run
- Bruner Run
- Brush Creek (Connoquenessing Creek)
- Brush Creek (Raystown Branch Juniata River)
- Brush Creek (Shaffer Creek)
- Brush Creek (Wills Creek)
- Brush Run (Buffalo Creek)
- Brush Run (Jacobs Creek)
- Buck Creek
- Buck Run (Buffalo Creek)
- Buck Run (Little Muncy Creek)
- Buck Run (West Branch Brandywine Creek)
- Buck Run (West Branch Conococheague Creek)
- Buckwha Creek
- Buffalo Creek (Allegheny River)
- Buffalo Creek (Juniata River)
- Buffalo Creek (Ohio River)
- Buffalo Creek (West Branch Susquehanna River)
- Buffalo Run (Sewickley Creek)
- Buffalo Run (Spring Creek)
- Bull Creek
- Bullion Run
- Burgess Brook
- Burns Run
- Burrows Run
- Bushkill Creek
- Butler Creek
- Butternut Run
- Byberry Creek

C

- Cabin Creek
- Cabin Run (Tohickon Creek)
- Cabin Run (Columbia County)
- Cacoosing Creek
- Caldwell Creek
- Callender Gap Creek
- Calvin Run
- Campbells Run
- Camp Run (Connoquenessing Creek)
- Camp Run (Youghiogheny River)
- Carbon Run
- Carnahan Run
- Carr Run
- Casselman River
- Castile Run
- Castleman Run
- Catasauqua Creek
- Catawissa Creek
- Catfish Creek
- Catlin Brook
- Cayuta Creek
- Cedar Creek
- Cedar Run
- Chadakoin River
- Chaney Run
- Charley Run
- Chapman Creek
- Chapman Run
- Chartiers Creek
- Chartiers Run (Allegheny River)
- Chartiers Run (Chartiers Creek)
- Cheat River
- Cheeseman Run
- Chemung River
- Cherry Ridge Run
- Cherry Run (Oil Creek)
- Cherry Run (South Branch Bowman Creek)
- Cherrytree Run
- Chest Creek
- Chester Creek
- Chillisquaque Creek
- Chiques Creek
- Chimneystack Run
- Christina River
- Church Run
- Cider Run (Bowman Creek)
- Cider Run (Sutton Creek)
- Clarion River
- Clark Creek
- Clarks Creek
- Clearfield Creek
- Clover Creek
- Clover Hill Creek
- Coal Brook
- Coal Lick Run
- Coal Run (Chartiers Creek)
- Coal Run (North Branch Buffalo Creek)
- Coal Run (Shamokin Creek)
- Cobbs Creek
- Cocalico Creek
- Cocolamus Creek
- Codorus Creek
- Coffee Brook
- Coffee Creek
- Cohocksink Creek
- Cohoquinoque Creek
- Coles Creek
- Collins Creek
- Conemaugh River
- Conestoga River
- Conety Run
- Conewago Creek (East)
- Conewago Creek (West)
- Conewango Creek
- Conneaut Creek
- Conneauttee Creek
- Connell Run
- Connoquenessing Creek
- Conococheague Creek
- Conodoguinet Creek
- Conowingo Creek
- Conoy Creek
- Cooks Creek
- Cooks Run
- Coplay Creek
- Cornplanter Run
- Corn Run
- County Line Branch
- Coupler Run
- Cowanesque River
- Cowanshannock Creek
- Cowbell Hollow
- Covey Swamp Creek
- Cox Run
- Crab Run
- Cranberry Creek
- Cranberry Run
- Crawford Run
- Creasy Creek
- Cresheim Creek
- Crooked Creek (Allegheny River)
- Crooked Creek (Kitchen Creek)
- Crooked Creek (Tioga River)
- Crooked Run (Catawissa Creek)
- Crooked Run (Monongahela River)
- Crooked Run (Youghiogheny River)
- Cross Creek
- Cross Fork
- Cross Run
- Cucumber Run
- Culver Creek
- Curls Run
- Cussewago Creek
- Cuttalosa Creek

D

- Damon Run
- Daniels Run
- Darby Creek
- Dark Hollow Run (Crooked Creek)
- Dark Hollow Run (Delaware River)
- Dark Run
- Darrow Brook
- Darrows Creek
- Davis Run
- Dead Creek
- Delaware River
- Delaware Run
- Deep Creek (Mahantango Creek)
- Deep Creek (Pine Creek)
- Deep Hollow
- Deep Run
- Deer Creek (Allegheny River)
- Deer Creek (Harford County)
- Deerlick Run
- Deer Run
- Derr Run
- Devil Hole Run
- Dickerson Run
- Dimple Creek
- Dobson Run
- Dock Creek
- Dog Run
- Dolly Run
- Donegal Creek
- Dooley Run
- Douglas Hollow
- Drakes Creek
- Drake Run
- Dressler Run
- Driftwood Branch
- Drury Run
- Dry Branch Creek
- Dry Creek
- Dry Run (Susquehecka Creek)
- Dry Run (West Branch Susquehanna River)
- Dunbar Creek
- Dundaff Creek
- Dunderdale Creek
- Dunkard Creek
- Dunkle Run
- Dunning Creek
- Dutch Fork
- Dyberry Creek
- Dyers Creek

E

- East Branch Brandywine Creek
- East Branch Briar Creek
- East Branch Chester Creek
- East Branch Chillisquaque Creek
- East Branch Clarion River
- East Branch Field Brook
- East Branch Fishing Creek
- East Branch Lackawanna River
- East Branch Martins Creek
- East Branch Octoraro Creek
- East Branch Oil Creek
- East Branch Perkiomen Creek
- East Branch Rausch Creek
- East Branch Raven Creek
- East Branch Roaring Brook
- East Branch Saucon Creek
- East Branch Sugar Creek
- East Branch Tunkhannock Creek
- East Branch Tunungwant Creek
- East Branch Wallenpaupack Creek
- East Fork Harveys Creek
- East Licking Creek
- East Sandy Creek
- East Shreve Run
- Eckles Run
- Eddy Creek
- Edwards Run
- Elk Creek (Lake Erie)
- Elk Creek (Loyalsock Creek)
- Elk Run
- Espy Run
- Evitts Creek

F

- Fades Creek
- Fall Brook
- Fallow Hollow
- Falls Creek
- Falls Run
- Farr Hollow
- Federal Run
- Fenton Run
- Fester Hollow
- Fiddle Lake Creek
- Fidlers Run
- Field Brook
- First Fork Sinnemahoning Creek
- Fish Dam Run
- Fisher Run
- Fishing Creek (Bald Eagle Creek)
- Fishing Creek (North Susquehanna River)
- Fishing Creek (Susquehanna River)
- Flintstone Creek
- Foster Brook
- Four Mile Run (Pittsburgh)
- Fox Hollow
- French Creek
- Frankstown Branch Juniata River
- Frankford Creek
- Frozen Run
- Furnace Run (Catawissa Creek)
- Furnace Run (Youghiogheny River)

G

- Galley Run
- Gallows Run (Delaware River)
- Gallows Run (Elk Run)
- Gardner Creek (Mill Creek)
- Gardner Creek (Susquehanna River)
- Gar Run
- Gaskins Run
- Gazzam Run
- Genesee River
- Georges Creek
- Georges Run
- German Run
- Gilbert Run
- Gillespie Run
- Girtys Run
- Glade Run (Dunkard Creek)
- Glade Run (Slippery Rock Creek)
- Glade Run (West Branch Susquehanna River)
- Glen Brook
- Grassy Island Creek
- Gravel Run (French Creek)
- Gravel Run (Susquehanna River)
- Green Creek
- Green Run
- Grindstone Run
- Guinn Run
- Gulph Creek
- Gunpowder River

H

- Halfway Run
- Hallowing Run
- Hall Run
- Halter Creek
- Hammer Creek
- Hammersley Fork
- Hanen Run
- Hans Yost Creek
- Hare Creek
- Harrisburg Run
- Harmon Creek
- Harveys Creek
- Haycock Creek
- Hay Creek
- Haynan Creek
- Hazel Creek
- Heberly Run
- Hell Run
- Hemlock Creek
- Hemlock Run
- Henderson Run
- Hen Run
- Henry Lott Brook
- Hermesprota Creek
- Herod Run
- Herrold Run
- Hess Hollow
- Hettesheimer Run
- Hickman Run
- Hickory Creek
- Hicks Creek
- Hobbs Run
- Hoffer Creek
- Hog Run
- Hogue Run
- Hokendauqua Creek
- Hollow Run
- Honey Creek
- Hop Bottom Creek
- Horton Creek (Oxbow Creek)
- Horton Creek (Tunkhannock Creek)
- Horton Run
- Hottenbaugh Run
- Houghs Creek
- Hubbel Run
- Hughey Run
- Hull Creek
- Hungry Run
- Hunkydory Creek
- Hunlock Creek
- Hunters Run (Neshannock Creek)
- Hunters Run (Sewickley Creek)
- Huntington Creek
- Hunts Run
- Huntsville Creek
- Hyner Run

I

- Idlewild Creek
- Independence Run
- Indian Camp Run
- Indian Cave Creek
- Indian Creek (Cobbs Creek)
- Indian Creek (Mauses Creek)
- Indian Creek (Youghiogheny River)
- Indian Run (Little Schuylkill River)
- Indian Run (Neshannock Creek)
- Ironstone Creek
- Ironworks Creek
- Irvin Branch
- Ithan Creek

J

- Jacks Run
- Jacobs Creek (Monongahela River)
- Jacobs Creek (Youghiogheny River)
- Jakes Run
- Jaminson Run
- Jenkins Run
- Jericho Creek
- Jim Run
- Johnson Creek
- Johnson Run
- Jonathan Run
- Jordan Creek
- Juniata River

K

- Kase Run
- Kashinka Hollow
- Kasson Brook
- Kendall Creek
- Kehly Run
- Kellum Creek
- Kelly Run
- Kennedy Creek
- Kern Glen Creek
- Keyser Creek
- Kinney Run
- Kingsbury Brook
- Kinzua Creek
- Kipps Run
- Kissem Run
- Kiskiminetas River
- Kishacoquillas Creek
- Kistler Creek
- Kitchen Creek
- Klingermans Run
- Kratzer Run
- Kreutz Creek

L

- Lackawaxen River
- Lafferty Run
- Lahaska Creek
- Lake Creek
- Lake Run
- Lampblack Creek
- Langan Creek
- Langmade Brook
- Lardintown Run
- Larrys Creek
- Latchaw Creek
- Latimore Creek
- Laurel Hill Creek
- Laurel Run (Bennett Branch)
- Laurel Run (Conemaugh River)
- Laurel Run (Huntington Creek)
- Laurel Run (Jacobs Creek)
- Laurel Run (Lackawanna River)
- Laurel Run (Little Muncy Creek)
- Laurel Run (Mill Creek)
- Laurel Run (West Branch Fishing Creek)
- Lawrence Run
- Leach Creek
- Lead Run
- LeBoeuf Creek
- Leggetts Creek
- Lehigh River
- Leiningers Run
- Leonard Creek
- Lees Creek
- Leslie Creek
- LeTort Spring Run
- Lewis Creek
- Lick Branch
- Lick Creek
- Lick Run (Clinton County, Pennsylvania)
- Lick Run (Little Fishing Creek)
- Lick Run (Peters Creek)
- Lick Run (Sewickley Creek)
- Lick Run (Sugar Creek)
- Lick Run (West Branch Susquehanna River)
- Lick Run (Youghiogheny River)
- Licking Creek
- Licking Run
- Lidy Creek
- Lilley Run
- Lindy Creek
- Linesville Creek
- Lithia Springs Creek
- Lititz Run
- Little Aughwick Creek
- Little Black Creek
- Little Brier Run
- Little Brokenstraw Creek
- Little Buffalo Creek
- Little Bull Creek
- Little Bushkill Creek
- Little Bush Kill
- Little Butler Creek
- Little Catawissa Creek
- Little Chartiers Creek
- Little Clearfield Creek
- Little Conneauttee Creek
- Little Conemaugh River
- Little Conestoga Creek
- Little Conococheague Creek
- Little Creek
- Little Crooked Run
- Little Darby Creek
- Little Fishing Creek
- Little Green Creek
- Little Indian Run
- Little Juniata River
- Little Lehigh Creek
- Little Loyalsock Creek
- Little Mahanoy Creek
- Little Mahantango Creek
- Little Mehoopany Creek
- Little Meshoppen Creek
- Little Muncy Creek
- Little Nescopeck Creek
- Little Neshaminy Creek
- Little Neshannock Creek
- Little Pine Creek (Luzerne County)
- Little Pine Creek (Lycoming County)
- Little Pucketa Creek
- Little Roaring Brook
- Little Roaring Creek
- Little Sandy Creek
- Little Schuylkill River
- Little Sewickley Creek
- Little Shamokin Creek
- Little Shenango River
- Little Shickshinny Creek
- Little Swatara Creek
- Little Tacony Creek
- Little Toby Creek
- Little Tomhicken Creek
- Little Tonoloway Creek
- Little Wapwallopen Creek
- Little Wills Creek
- Limestone Run (Montour County)
- Limestone Run (Union County)
- Lizard Creek
- Locust Creek
- Logan Run
- Long Hollow
- Long Run (Cranberry Creek)
- Long Run (Elk Run)
- Long Run (Nescopeck Creek)
- Lost Creek
- Lower Little Swatara Creek
- Loyalhanna Creek
- Loyalsock Creek
- Lucky Run
- Luphers Run
- Lycoming Creek

M

- Mackey Run
- Mahanoy Creek
- Mahantango Creek (Susquehanna River)
- Mahantango Creek (Snyder & Juniata County)
- Mahoning Creek (Allegheny River)
- Mahoning Creek (Lehigh River)
- Mahoning Creek (Susquehanna River)
- Mahoning River
- Maiden Creek
- Manada Creek
- Manatawny Creek
- Maple Run
- Maple Spring Brook
- Marilla Brook
- Marshalls Creek
- Marsh Creek (Bowman Creek)
- Marsh Creek (Monocacy River)
- Marsh Creek (Pine Creek)
- Marsh Creek (Rogers Creek)
- Marsh Run (Coles Creek)
- Martins Creek (Delaware River, Bucks County)
- Martins Creek (Delaware River, Martins Creek)
- Martins Creek (Tunkhannock Creek)
- Matthews Run
- Mauses Creek
- Mauch Chunk Creek
- McDonald Run
- McDowell Run
- McIntire Run
- McKinney Run
- McLaughlin Creek
- McLaughlin Run
- McMicheal Creek
- McMurray Run
- McPherson Creek
- Meadow Brook
- Meadowbrook Run
- Meadow Run (Dunkard Creek)
- Meadow Run (Jacobs Creek)
- Meadow Run (Youghiogheny River)
- Mead Run
- Mehoopany Creek
- Meeker Run
- Meredith Brook
- Meredith Creek
- Messers Run
- Middle Creek (Cocalico Creek)
- Middle Creek (Lackawaxen River)
- Middle Creek (Penns Creek)
- Middle Creek (Schwaben Creek)
- Middle Creek (Toms Creek)
- Middle Fork Cross Creek
- Middle Run
- Middle Spring Creek
- Millard Creek
- Mile Run
- Mill Creek (Clarion River)
- Mill Creek (Conestoga River)
- Mill Creek (Delaware River)
- Mill Creek (Juniata River)
- Mill Creek (Lackawanna River)
- Mill Creek (Lake Erie)
- Mill Creek (Lower Merion)
- Mill Creek (Loyalsock Creek)
- Mill Creek (Neshaminy Creek, Doylestown)
- Mill Creek (Neshaminy Creek, Northampton)
- Mill Creek (Neshaminy Creek, Wrightstown)
- Mill Creek (Philadelphia)
- Mill Creek (Reilly Creek)
- Mill Creek (Roaring Creek)
- Mill Creek (Susquehanna River)
- Mill Creek (White Clay Creek)
- Mill Run (Neshannock Creek)
- Miller Brook
- Millers Run (Chartiers Creek)
- Millers Run (Shamokin Creek)
- Minard Run
- Mine Gap Run
- Mingo Creek
- Mink Run
- Mitchler Run
- Mohawk Run
- Monocacy Creek (Lehigh River)
- Monocacy Creek (Schuylkill River)
- Monongahela River
- Monroe Creek
- Montgomery Run
- Montour Run
- Monument Creek
- Morgan Run
- Mosey Run
- Moshannon Creek
- Mosquito Creek
- Mountain Creek (Georges Creek)
- Mountain Creek (Yellow Breeches Creek)
- Mounts Creek
- Mouse Creek
- Muckinipattis Creek
- Mud Creek
- Mud Run (Bermudian Creek)
- Mud Run (Green Creek)
- Muddy Creek (Conestoga River)
- Muddy Creek (French Creek)
- Muddy Creek (Slippery Rock Creek)
- Muddy Creek (Susquehanna River)
- Muddy Run (Conodoguinet Creek)
- Muddy Run (Georges Creek)
- Muddy Run (Spruce Run)
- Muddy Run (West Branch Susquehanna River)
- Mugser Run
- Muncy Creek
- Murray Run

N

- Naamans Creek
- Nanticoke Creek
- Narigan Run
- Naylors Run
- Negro Hollow
- Nescopeck Creek
- Neshaminy Creek
- Neshannock Creek
- Nesquehoning Creek
- Newport Creek
- Newton Run
- Newtown Creek
- Nine Partners Creek
- North Branch Bowman Creek
- North Branch Buffalo Creek
- North Branch Calvin Run
- North Branch Mahantango Creek
- North Branch Mehoopany Creek
- North Branch Neshaminy Creek
- North Branch Shamokin Creek
- North Branch Slippery Rock Creek
- North Deer Creek
- North East Creek
- North Fork Creek
- North Fork Cross Creek
- North Fork Tangascootack Creek
- Northkill Creek
- North Mahanoy Creek
- Nuangola Outlet

O

- Oak Run
- Oil Creek
- Oley Creek
- Ontelaunee Creek
- Opossum Brook
- Opossum Creek
- Ore Run
- Oswayo Creek
- Otter Creek
- Oxbow Creek
- Oxbow Inlet
- Oxhorn Run

P

- Packers Run
- Paddy Run
- Painter Creek
- Painter Run
- Painters Run
- Paint Spring Run
- Pancoast Creek
- Panther Creek (Little Schuylkill River)
- Panther Creek (Spring Brook)
- Panther Run (Anderson Creek)
- Panther Run (North Branch Buffalo Creek)
- Paper Mill Run
- Paradise Creek
- Paris Run
- Park Creek
- Parmar Run
- Partners Creek
- Paunnacussing Creek
- Paxton Creek
- Pennbrook Run
- Penns Creek
- Pennypack Creek
- Pequea Creek
- Perkiomen Creek
- Peterman Run
- Peters Creek
- Phillips Creek
- Pickering Creek
- Pidcock Creek
- Pigeon Run
- Pikes Creek
- Pine Creek (Allegheny River)
- Pine Creek (Huntington Creek)
- Pine Creek (Mahantango Creek)
- Pine Creek (Oil Creek)
- Pine Creek (Penns Creek)
- Pine Creek (Solomon Creek)
- Pine Creek (West Branch Susquehanna River)
- Pine Run (Mill Creek)
- Pine Run (Neshannock Creek)
- Pine Run (North Branch Neshaminy Creek)
- Pine Run (South Branch French Creek)
- Pinkerton Run
- Pithole Creek
- Pitzer Run
- Plank Bridge Creek
- Pleasant Stream
- Plum Creek (Allegheny River)
- Plum Creek (Little Shamokin Creek)
- Plum Run (Rock Creek)
- Plum Run (Tenmile Creek)
- Plum Run (White Run)
- Plunketts Creek
- Pocono Creek
- Pohopoco Creek
- Pollock Run
- Pond Creek
- Poquessing Creek
- Porky Run
- Potato Creek
- Potter Run
- Powderly Creek
- Powell Creek
- Price Creek
- Pucketa Creek
- Pumpkin Run
- Pymatuning Creek

Q

- Quakake Creek
- Quaker Run (Shamokin Creek)
- Quaker Run (West Branch Mahantango Creek)
- Quebec Run
- Queen Anne Creek
- Quinn Run
- Quittapahilla Creek

R

- Rabbit Run
- Raccoon Creek (Beaver County)
- Raccoon Creek (Erie County)
- Raccoon Creek (Tomhicken Creek)
- Rachel Carson Run
- Racket Brook
- Ralston Run
- Ramcat Run
- Rapid Run
- Rapp Creek
- Rattlesnake Creek
- Rattling Run (Catawissa Creek)
- Rattling Run (Little Mahanoy Creek)
- Rauchtown Run
- Raups Run
- Rausch Creek
- Raven Creek
- Raystown Branch Juniata River
- Reading Creek
- Reason Run
- Redbank Creek
- Red Brook
- Red Clay Creek
- Red Spring Run
- Redstone Creek
- Reyburn Creek
- Richey Run
- Rickard Hollow
- Riddle Run
- Ridley Creek
- Roaring Brook (Hunlock Creek)
- Roaring Brook (Lackawanna River)
- Roaring Run
- Robinson Run
- Rock Bottom Creek
- Rock Creek (Monocacy River)
- Rock Creek (Tunkhannock Creek)
- Rock Spring Run
- Rocky Hollow
- Rocky Run (Bull Creek)
- Rocky Run (Susquehanna River)
- Roberts Run
- Robin Run
- Rodges Run
- Rogers Brook
- Rogers Creek
- Rogers Hollow
- Rolling Green Run
- Rough Run
- Ruff Creek
- Rundelltown Creek
- Rush Brook
- Rutherford Run

S

- Sacony Creek
- Saint Johns Creek
- Salem Creek
- Salt Lick Creek
- Sand Spring Run
- Sandy Creek
- Sandy Lick Creek
- Sandy Run
- Saucon Creek
- Scholars Run
- Schrader Creek
- Schuylkill River
- Schwaben Creek
- Sciota Brook
- Scotch Run (Black Creek)
- Scotch Run (Catawissa Creek)
- Scott Run
- Scotts Creek
- Scotts Run
- Scouten Brook
- Scrubgrass Run
- Sealholtz Run
- Seaton Creek
- Sechler Run
- Sewickley Creek
- Shade Creek
- Shadigee Creek
- Shaffer Creek
- Shamokin Creek
- Shanty Run
- Shaw Run
- Shaver Creek
- Sheepskin Run
- Shehawken Creek
- Shenandoah Creek
- Shenango Creek
- Shepman Run
- Sheppard Run
- Shermans Creek
- Sherrick Run
- Shickshinny Creek
- Shingle Cabin Brook
- Shingle Mill Run
- Shingle Run (Huntington Creek)
- Shingle Run (West Branch Run)
- Shirley Run
- Shohola Creek
- Shupe Run
- Sideling Hill Creek (Aughwick Creek)
- Sideling Hill Creek (Potomac River)
- Silver Creek
- Sinking Creek
- Sinnemahoning Creek
- Six Springs Creek
- Skippack Creek
- Skunk Run
- Slab Cabin Run
- Slate Run
- Slaughter Run
- Slide Hollow
- Slippery Rock Creek
- Slip Run
- Smiley Run
- Smith Cabin Run
- Smithtown Creek
- Snake Creek
- Snake Run
- Snare Run
- Snow Creek
- Soloman Creek
- Somer Brook
- Sorber Run
- South Branch Bowman Creek
- South Branch Codorus Creek
- South Branch Conewago Creek
- South Branch French Creek
- South Branch Leach Creek
- South Branch Newport Creek
- South Branch Roaring Creek
- South Branch Roaring Run
- South Branch Slippery Rock Creek
- South Branch Towanda Creek
- South Branch Tunkhannock Creek
- South Brook
- South Fork Cross Creek
- South Fork Tenmile Creek
- South Penn Run
- South Run
- South Sandy Creek
- Spencer Creek
- Spencer Run
- Spies Run
- Spring Brook
- Spring Creek (Bald Eagle Creek)
- Spring Creek (Brokenstraw Creek)
- Spring Creek (Little Lehigh Creek)
- Spring Creek (Susquehanna River)
- Spring Creek (White Deer Hole Creek)
- Spring Run (Solomon Creek)
- Spring Run (West Branch Susquehanna River)
- Spruce Creek
- Spruce Run (Buffalo Creek)
- Spruce Run (Little Fishing Creek)
- Squaw Run
- Stafford Meadow Brook
- Standing Stone Creek
- Starrucca Creek
- Stauffer Run
- Sterry Creek
- Stewart Run
- Stevens Run
- Stockman Run
- Stone Run
- Stoney Creek
- Stony Brook (Fishing Creek)
- Stony Brook (Mehoopany Creek)
- Stony Creek (Black Creek)
- Stony Creek (Susquehanna River)
- Stony Fork Creek
- Stony Hollow Run
- Stony Run (Anderson Creek)
- Stony Run (Buffalo Creek)
- Stony Run (Little Catawissa Creek)
- Stranger Hollow
- Streets Run
- Sugar Creek (French Creek)
- Sugar Creek (Susquehanna River)
- Sugar Hollow Creek
- Sugarloaf Creek
- Sugar Notch Run
- Sugar Run Creek
- Sugar Run (Bowman Creek)
- Sugar Run (Marsh Creek)
- Sugar Run (Youghiogheny River)
- Sullivan Branch
- Summit Lake Creek
- Susquehanna River
- Susquehecka Creek
- Sutton Creek
- Swabia Creek
- Swale Brook
- Swamp Creek (Delaware River)
- Swamp Creek (Perkiomen Creek)
- Swanks Run
- Swatara Creek

T

- Tacony Creek
- Tangascootack Creek
- Taques Creek
- Taylor Run
- Tebolt Run
- Tenmile Creek
- Tenmile Run
- Thompson Creek
- Thompson Run
- Thoms Run
- Threemile Run
- Three Springs Creek
- Tinicum Creek
- Tinker Creek
- Tinker Hollow
- Tioga River
- Tionesta Creek
- Toby Creek
- Tobyhanna Creek
- Toby Run
- Tohickon Creek
- Tomhicken Creek
- Toms Creek
- Toms Run
- Tonoloway Creek
- Torry Run
- Towanda Creek
- Tower Branch
- Town Creek
- Townley Run
- Township Line Run
- Treaster Run
- Trexler Run
- Troups Creek
- Trout Brook (South Branch Tunkhannock Creek)
- Trout Brook (Toby Creek)
- Trout Creek
- Trout Run (East Branch Fishing Creek)
- Tub Run
- Tucquan Creek
- Tulpehocken Creek
- Tunis Run
- Tunkhannock Creek (Susquehanna River)
- Tunkhannock Creek (Tobyhanna Creek)
- Tunungwant Creek
- Turkey Run
- Turtle Creek (Monongahela River)
- Turtle Creek (Susquehanna River)
- Turtle Creek (West Branch Susquehanna River)
- Tuscarora Creek (Juniata River)
- Twelvemile Creek
- Twentymile Creek
- Two Lick Creek
- Twomile Run (Kettle Creek)
- Two Mile Run (West Branch Tunungwant Creek)

U

- Unami Creek
- Utley Brook

V

- Valley Creek
- Van Auken Creek
- Van Brunt Creek
- Virgin Run

W

- Walker Run
- Wallace Run (Bald Eagle Creek)
- Wallace Run (Beaver River)
- Wallenpaupack Creek
- Wallis Run
- Walnut Creek
- Wampum Run
- Wappasening Creek
- War Branch
- Ward Run
- Warrior Creek
- Warrior Run
- Washington Run
- Wasp Branch
- Watering Run
- Watkins Run
- Watrous Run
- Watson Creek
- Welch Run
- Welty Run
- West Branch Brandywine Creek
- West Branch Briar Creek
- West Branch Caldwell Creek
- West Branch Chester Creek
- West Branch Chillisquaque Creek
- West Branch Conococheague Creek
- West Branch Cussewago Creek
- West Branch Delaware River
- West Branch Dyberry Creek
- West Branch Fishing Creek
- West Branch French Creek
- West Branch Lackawanna River
- West Branch Lackawaxen River
- West Branch Little Muncy Creek
- West Branch Mahantango Creek
- West Branch Neshaminy Creek
- West Branch Octoraro Creek
- West Branch Perkiomen Creek
- West Branch Pine Creek
- West Branch Rausch Creek
- West Branch Tunungwant Creek
- West Branch Run
- West Branch Schuylkill River
- West Branch Susquehanna River
- West Branch Tinklepaugh Creek
- West Branch Wallenpaupack Creek
- West Creek
- West Hemlock Creek
- West Shreve Run
- Whiskey Run
- White Brook
- White Clay Creek
- White Deer Creek
- White Deer Hole Creek
- White Hall Creek
- White Oak Run (Lackawanna River)
- White Run
- Whitney Run
- Wildcat Creek
- Willoughby Run
- Willow Brook
- Wills Creek
- Wilson Creek
- Wilson Run (Kipps Run)
- Wilson Run (Sewickley Creek)
- Windfall Run
- Winebrenner Run
- Winfield Creek
- Wingohocking Creek
- Wissahickon Creek
- Wolf Creek
- Wolffs Run
- Wolfhouse Run
- Wolf Run (Bowman Creek)
- Wolf Run (Buffalo Creek)
- Wolf Run (Muncy Creek)
- Wolf Run (North Branch Mehoopany Creek)
- Wolf Run (Tohickon Creek)
- Woodcock Creek
- Workman Run
- Wyalusing Creek
- Wyomissing Creek
- Wysox Creek

Y

- Yankee Run
- Yellow Breeches Creek
- Yellow Creek (Juniata River)
- Yellow Creek (Two Lick Creek)
- York Hollow
- York Run (Bowman Creek)
- York Run (Georges Creek)
- Youghiogheny River
- Young Womans Creek

Z

- Zerbe Run

== See also ==
- List of canals in the United States
- List of lakes in Pennsylvania
- List of rivers of the United States
