= Herod Run =

Stream in Pennsylvania, US

Coordinates: 40°37′26″N 77°51′32″W

Herod Run is a stream in the U.S. state of Pennsylvania. It is a tributary to Standing Stone Creek.

Herod Run was named after a pioneer hunter.

== See also ==
- List of rivers of Pennsylvania
