= Hubbel Run =

Stream in Pennsylvania, USA

Hubbel Run Tributary to French Creek
- Location of Hubbel Run mouth Hubbel Run (the United States)

Location
- Country: United States
- State: Pennsylvania
- County: Erie County
- Borough: Wattsburg

Physical characteristics
- Source: Beaver Run divide
  - location: about 2.25 miles (3.62 km) northwest of Beaver Dam, Pennsylvania
  - coordinates: 41°57′18″N 079°46′20″W
  - elevation: 1,550 ft (470 m)
- Mouth: French Creek
  - location: Wattsburg, Pennsylvania
  - coordinates: 41°59′52″N 079°48′34″W
  - elevation: 1,276 ft (389 m)
- Length: 4.57 mi (7.35 km)
- Basin size: 8.31 square miles (21.5 km^{2})
- Discharge
  - location: French Creek
  - average: 16.31 cu ft/s (0.462 m^{3}/s) at mouth with French Creek

Basin features
- Progression: generally northwest
- River system: Allegheny River
- Tributaries
  - left: unnamed tributaries
  - right: unnamed tributaries
- Bridges: PA 89, Hayes Road, State Line Road

Hubbel Run is a 4.57 mi (7.35 km) long second-order tributary to French Creek in Erie County. This is the only stream in the United States with this name.

== Course ==
Hubbel Run rises about 2.25 miles (3.62 km) northwest of Beaver Dam, Pennsylvania, and then flows northwesterly to join French Creek at Wattsburg, Pennsylvania.

== Watershed ==
Hubbel Run drains 8.31 square miles (21.5 km^{2}) of area, receives about 46.7 inches (1,190 mm) per year of precipitation, and is about 62.4% forested.

== See also ==
- List of rivers of Pennsylvania
