= Dog Run (Buffalo Creek tributary) =

Stream in Pennsylvania, USA

Dog Run Tributary to Buffalo Creek
- Location of Dog Run mouth Dog Run (Buffalo Creek tributary) (the United States)

Location
- Country: United States
- State: Pennsylvania
- County: Washington

Physical characteristics
- Source: North Prong Castleman Run divide
  - location: about 2 miles south of Dunsfort, Pennsylvania
  - coordinates: 40°10′02″N 080°30′13″W
  - elevation: 1,170 ft (360 m)
- Mouth: Buffalo Creek
  - location: Dunsfort, Pennsylvania
  - coordinates: 40°11′19″N 080°30′07″W
  - elevation: 843 ft (257 m)
- Length: 2.31 mi (3.72 km)
- Basin size: 1.33 square miles (3.4 km^{2})
- Discharge
  - location: Buffalo Creek
  - average: 1.66 cu ft/s (0.047 m^{3}/s) at mouth with Buffalo Creek

Basin features
- Progression: Buffalo Creek → Ohio River → Mississippi River → Gulf of Mexico
- River system: Ohio River
- Tributaries
  - left: unnamed tributaries
  - right: unnamed tributaries
- Bridges: Dry Ridge Road

Dog Run is a 2.31 mi (3.72 km) long 1st order tributary to Buffalo Creek in Washington County, Pennsylvania.

== Course ==
Dog Run rises about 2 miles south of Dunsfort, Pennsylvania, in Washington County and then flows north and northwest to join Buffalo Creek at Dunsfort.

== Watershed ==
Dog Run drains 1.33 square miles (3.4 km^{2}) of area, receives about 40.2 in/year of precipitation, has a wetness index of 300.49, and is about 78% forested.

== See also ==
- List of Pennsylvania Rivers
