= Cabin Creek (Susquehanna River tributary) =

Stream in Pennsylvania, United States

Coordinates: 39.970084°N 76.491866°W

Cabin Creek is a 11.0-mile-long (17.7 km) tributary of the Susquehanna River in York County, Pennsylvania in the United States.

Cabin Creek joins the Susquehanna near the outskirts of East Prospect borough.

== See also ==
- List of rivers of Pennsylvania
