= Jonathan Run (Youghiogheny River tributary) =

Stream in Pennsylvania, USA

Jonathan Run Tributary to Youghiogheny River
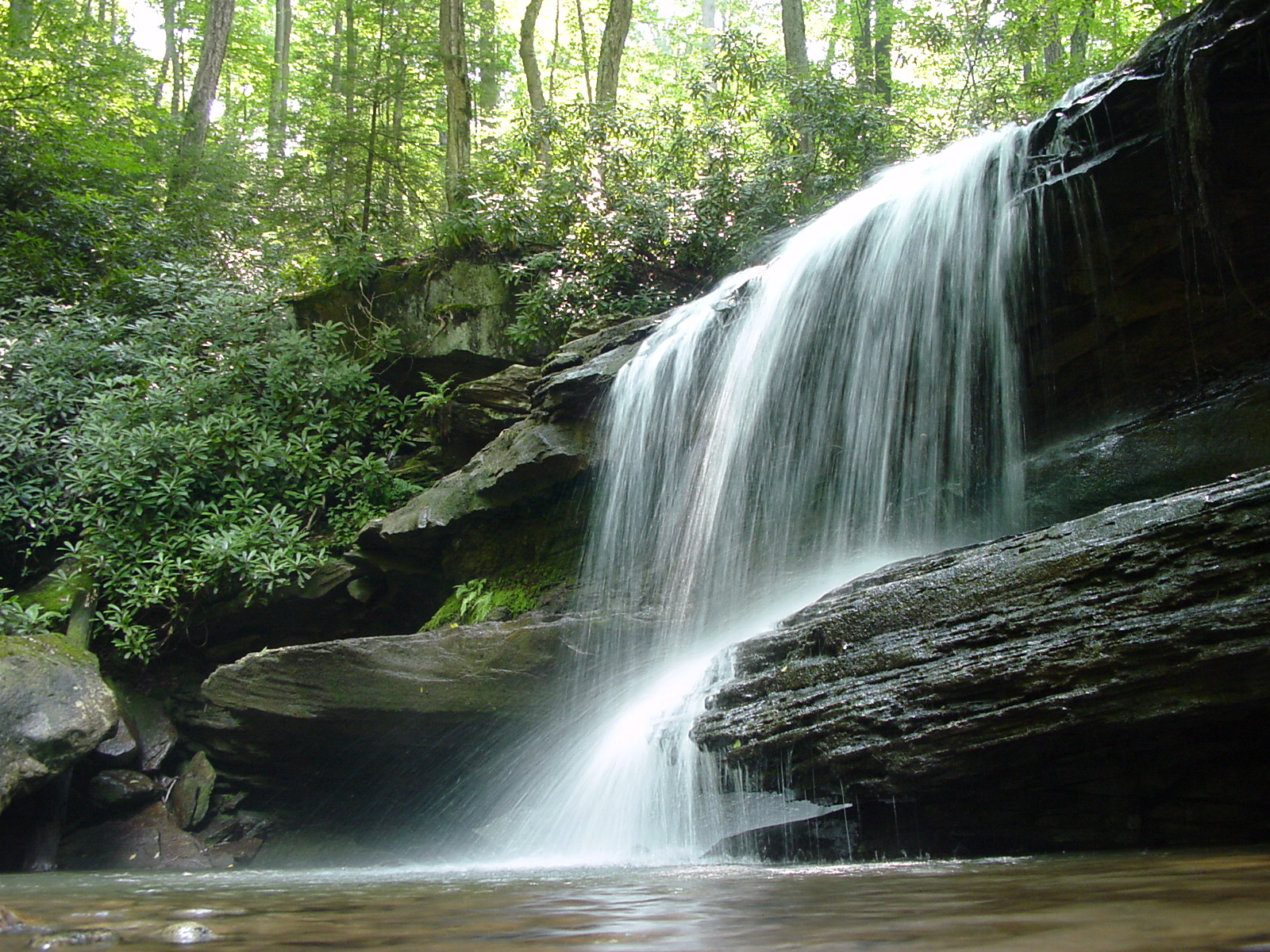
- Jonathan Run Falls

- Location of Jonathan Run mouth Jonathan Run (Youghiogheny River tributary) (the United States)

Location
- Country: United States
- State: Pennsylvania
- County: Fayette

Physical characteristics
- Source: Glade Run divide
  - location: about 2 miles west of Kaufmann, Pennsylvania
  - coordinates: 39°52′35″N 079°33′30″W
  - elevation: 2,240 ft (680 m)
- Mouth: Youghiogheny River
  - location: about 3 miles northeast of Deer Lake, Pennsylvania
  - coordinates: 39°54′17″N 079°29′20″W
  - elevation: 999 ft (304 m)
- Length: 4.95 mi (7.97 km)
- Basin size: 6.47 square miles (16.8 km^{2})
- Discharge
  - location: Youghiogheny River
  - average: 14.25 cu ft/s (0.404 m^{3}/s) at mouth with Youghiogheny River

Basin features
- Progression: Youghiogheny River → Monongahela River → Ohio River → Mississippi River → Gulf of Mexico
- River system: Monongahela River
- Tributaries
  - left: Blackberry Run
  - right: unnamed tributaries
- Bridges: Dunbar Road, Holland Hill Road (x3)

Jonathan Run is a 4.95 mi (7.97 km) long 2nd order tributary to the Youghiogheny River in Fayette County, Pennsylvania.

== Variant names ==
According to the Geographic Names Information System, it has also been known historically as:

- Jonathans Run

== Course ==
Jonathan Run rises about 2 miles west of Kaufmann, Pennsylvania, and then flows northeast to join the Youghiogheny River about 1 mile north of Deer Lake.

== Watershed ==
Jonathan Run drains 6.47 square miles (16.8 km^{2}) of area, receives about 50.0 in/year of precipitation, has a wetness index of 343.71, and is about 94% forested.

== See also ==
- List of rivers of Pennsylvania
