= Camp Run (Youghiogheny River tributary) =

Stream in Pennsylvania, United States

Camp Run Tributary to Youghiogheny River
- Location of Camp Run mouth Camp Run (Youghiogheny River tributary) (the United States)

Location
- Country: United States
- State: Pennsylvania
- County: Fayette; Somerset

Physical characteristics
- Source: Youghiogheny River divide
  - location: about 1 mile northeast of Bidwell, Pennsylvania
  - coordinates: 39°51′55″N 079°24′23″W
  - elevation: 2,160 ft (660 m)
- Mouth: Youghiogheny River
  - location: Bidwell, Pennsylvania
  - coordinates: 39°51′20″N 079°25′10″W
  - elevation: 1,275 ft (389 m)
- Length: 1.04 mi (1.67 km)
- Basin size: 0.54 square miles (1.4 km^{2})
- Discharge
  - location: Youghiogheny River
  - average: 1.16 cu ft/s (0.033 m^{3}/s) at mouth with Youghiogheny River

Basin features
- Progression: generally south
- River system: Monongahela River
- Tributaries
  - left: unnamed tributaries
  - right: unnamed tributaries
- Bridges: none

Camp Run is a 1.04 mi (1.67 km) long 1st order tributary to the Youghiogheny River in Fayette County, Pennsylvania, United States.

== Course ==
Camp Run rises about 1 mile northeast of Bidwell, Pennsylvania, in Somerset County and then flows south-southwest into Fayette County to join the Youghiogheny River at Bidwell.

== Watershed ==
Camp Run drains 0.54 square miles (1.4 km^{2}) of area, receives about 48.5 in/year of precipitation, has a wetness index of 308.44, and is about 98% forested.

== See also ==
- List of rivers of Pennsylvania
