= Alder Run =

Stream in Pennsylvania, USA

Alder Run Tributary to French Creek
- Location of Alder Run mouth Alder Run (the United States)

Location
- Country: United States
- State: Pennsylvania
- County: Erie County

Physical characteristics
- Source: Bentley Run divide
  - location: about 3 miles northwest of Beaver Dam, Pennsylvania
  - coordinates: 41°56′03″N 079°48′09″W
  - elevation: 1,420 ft (430 m)
- Mouth: French Creek
  - location: about 3.5 miles southwest of Wattsburg, Pennsylvania
  - coordinates: 41°58′16″N 079°51′40″W
  - elevation: 1,243 ft (379 m)
- Length: 4.52 mi (7.27 km)
- Basin size: 7.07 square miles (18.3 km^{2})
- Discharge
  - location: French Creek
  - average: 13.68 cu ft/s (0.387 m^{3}/s) at mouth with French Creek

Basin features
- Progression: generally northwest
- River system: Allegheny River
- Tributaries
  - left: unnamed tributaries
  - right: unnamed tributaries
- Bridges: Game Land Road, Fenno Road, Old Wattsburg Road, Hatch Hollow Road, PA 8, Wattsburg-Waterford Road

Alder Run is a 4.52 mi (7.27 km) long third-order tributary to French Creek in Erie County.

== Course ==
Alder Run rises about 3 miles northwest of Beaver Dam, Pennsylvania, and then flows northwesterly to join French Creek about 3 miles southwest of Wattsburg, Pennsylvania.

== Watershed ==
Alder Run drains 7.07 square miles (18.3 km^{2}) of area, receives about 46.3 in/year of precipitation, and is about 36% forested.

== See also ==
- List of rivers of Pennsylvania
