= Damon Run (Brokenstraw Creek tributary) =

Stream in Pennsylvania, USA

Damon Run Tributary to Brokenstraw Creek
- Location of Damon Run mouth Damon Run (Brokenstraw Creek tributary) (the United States)

Location
- Country: United States
- State: Pennsylvania
- County: Warren

Physical characteristics
- Source: divide between Damon Run and Prosser Run
  - location: about 1 mile southeast of Baker Hill
  - coordinates: 41°54′43″N 079°31′33″W
  - elevation: 1,690 ft (520 m)
- Mouth: Brokenstraw Creek
  - location: about 1.5 miles northwest of Spring Creek, Pennsylvania
  - coordinates: 41°53′21″N 079°32′53″W
  - elevation: 1,368 ft (417 m)
- Length: 2.06 mi (3.32 km)
- Basin size: 2.17 square miles (5.6 km^{2})
- Discharge
  - location: Brokenstraw Creek
  - average: 4.42 cu ft/s (0.125 m^{3}/s) at mouth with Brokenstraw Creek

Basin features
- Progression: Brokenstraw Creek → Allegheny River → Ohio River → Mississippi River → Gulf of Mexico
- River system: Allegheny River
- Tributaries
  - left: unnamed tributaries
  - right: unnamed tributaries
- Bridges: Way Road, Lucky Lane

Damon Run is a 2.06 mi (3.32 km) long 2nd order tributary to Brokenstraw Creek. It is classed as a cold-water fishery by the Pennsylvania Fish and Boat Commission.

== Course ==
Damon Run rises on the divide between it and Prosser Run in Warren County, Pennsylvania about 1 mile southeast of Baker Hill and flows southeast to meet Brokenstraw Creek about 1.5 miles northwest of Spring Creek, Pennsylvania.

== Watershed ==
Damon Run drains 2.17 square miles (5.6 km^{2}) of the Pennsylvania High Plateau province and the northwestern glaciated plateau and is underlaid by the Venango Formation. The watershed receives an average of 45.8 in/year of precipitation and has a wetness index of 393.52. The watershed is about 62% forested.

== See also ==
- List of rivers of Pennsylvania
