= Henderson Run (Pine Creek tributary) =

Waterway in Crawford County, Pennsylvania

Henderson Run Tributary to Pine Creek
- Location within Pennsylvania Location within the United States

Location
- Country: United States
- State: Pennsylvania
- County: Crawford

Physical characteristics
- Source: divide between Henderson Run and Porky Run
  - location: about 2 miles west of Dotyville, Pennsylvania
  - coordinates: 41°40′02″N 079°38′16″W
  - elevation: 1,620 ft (490 m)
- Mouth: Pine Creek
  - location: about 1 mile northeast of East Titusville, Pennsylvania
  - coordinates: 41°37′50″N 079°37′12″W
  - elevation: 1,184 ft (361 m)
- Length: 3.3 mi (5.3 km)
- Basin size: 1.81 square miles (4.7 km^{2})
- Discharge
  - location: Pine Creek
  - average: 3.55 cu ft/s (0.101 m^{3}/s) at mouth with Pine Creek

Basin features
- Progression: south-southeast
- River system: Allegheny River (Oil Creek)
- Tributaries
  - left: unnamed tributaries
  - right: unnamed tributaries
- Bridges: Spring Creek Road, Keyes Road

Henderson Run is a 3.3 mi (5.3 km) long 1st order tributary to Pine Creek in Crawford County, Pennsylvania.

== Course ==
Henderson Run rises about 2 miles west of Dotyville, Pennsylvania in Crawford County and then flows south-southeast to Pine Creek about 1 mile northeast of East Titusville, Pennsylvania.

== Watershed ==
Henderson Run drains 1.81 square miles (4.7 km^{2}) of area, receives about 44.9 in/year of precipitation, and has a wetness index of 433.72 and is about 81% forested.

== See also ==
- List of rivers of Pennsylvania

== Additional Maps ==
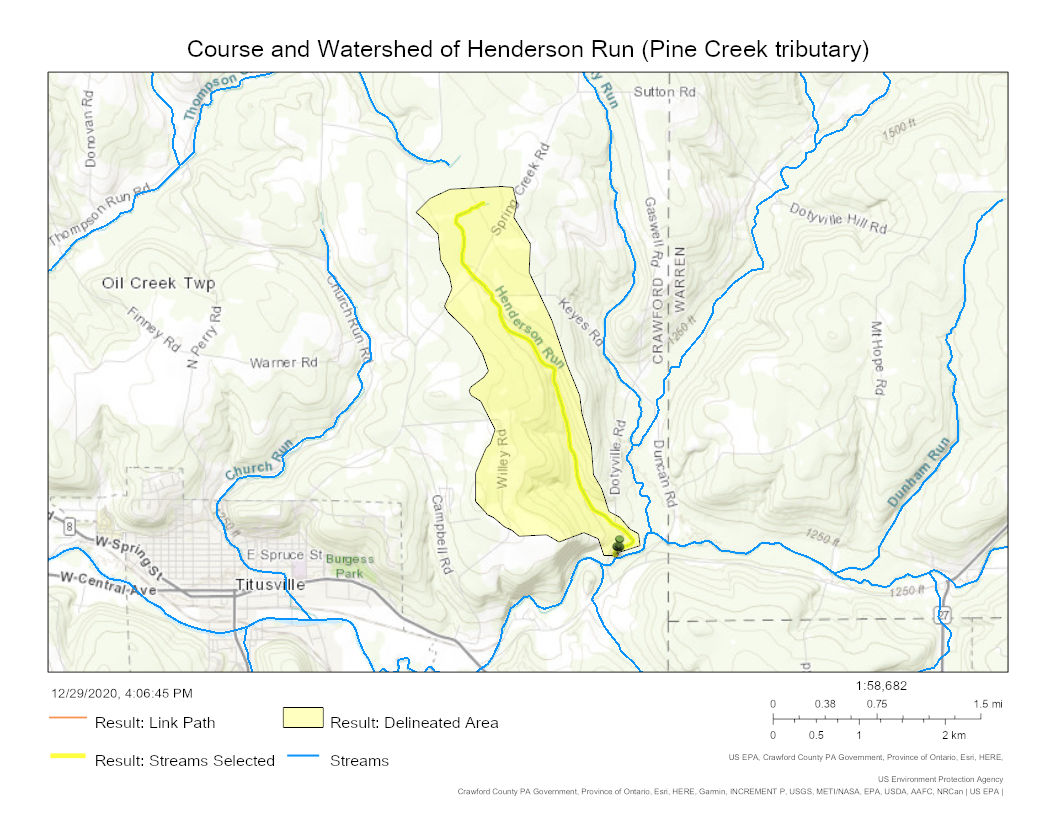
Course and Watershed of Henderson Run (Pine Creek tributary) in Crawford County, Pennsylvania
