= Campbells Run (Chartiers Creek tributary) =

Stream in Pennsylvania, US

Campbells Run Tributary to Chartiers Creek
- Location of Campbells Run mouth Campbells Run (Chartiers Creek tributary) (the United States)

Location
- Country: United States
- State: Pennsylvania
- County: Allegheny
- Borough: Carnegie

Physical characteristics
- Source: Montour Run divide
  - location: about 0.25 miles east of Montour Church
  - coordinates: 40°27′06″N 080°09′20″W
  - elevation: 1,140 ft (350 m)
- Mouth: Chartiers Creek
  - location: Carnegie, Pennsylvania
  - coordinates: 40°24′27″N 080°05′17″W
  - elevation: 779 ft (237 m)
- Length: 5.07 mi (8.16 km)
- Basin size: 5.61 square miles (14.5 km^{2})
- Discharge
  - location: Chartiers Creek
  - average: 5.50 cu ft/s (0.156 m^{3}/s) at mouth with Chartiers Creek

Basin features
- Progression: Chartiers Creek → Ohio River → Mississippi River → Gulf of Mexico
- River system: Ohio River
- Tributaries
  - left: unnamed tributaries
  - right: unnamed tributaries
- Bridges: Old Campbells Run Road, Marquis Plaza, Ridge Road, Boice Road, Campbells Run Road (x2), I-79, I-376, Campbells Run Road (x3), Wagner Street, Newell Street, Morrow Avenue, Railroad Avenue, Glass Street, Mansfield Boulevard

Campbells Run is a 5.07 mi (8.16 km) long 2nd order tributary to Chartiers Creek in Allegheny County, Pennsylvania.

== Variant names ==
According to the Geographic Names Information System, it has also been known historically as:

- Campbell's Creek

== Course ==
Campbells Run rises about 0.25 miles east of Montour Church and then flows southeast to join Chartiers Creek at Carnegie.

== Watershed ==
Campbells Run drains 5.01 square miles (13.0 km^{2}) of area, receives about 37.8 in/year of precipitation, has a wetness index of 337.81, and is about 36% forested.

== See also ==
- List of rivers of Pennsylvania
