= Bullion Run =

Stream in Pennsylvania, U.S.

Coordinates: 41°15′18″N 79°50′27″W

Bullion Run is a stream in the U.S. state of Pennsylvania. It is a tributary of Scrubgrass Creek.

Bullion Run was named after Thomas Bullion, a pioneer settler.

== See also ==
- List of rivers in Pennsylvania
- List of rivers In the United States
- List of canals in the United States
