= Latimore Creek =

Tributary of the Bermudian Creek in Pennsylvania

Coordinates: 40.003911°N 77.061282°W

Latimore Creek is a 6.7-mile-long (10.8 km) tributary of the Bermudian Creek in Adams County and York County, Pennsylvania in the United States.

Latimore Creek joins the Bermudian Creek in Latimore Township.

== See also ==
- List of rivers of Pennsylvania
