= Otter Creek (Susquehanna River tributary) =

Tributary of the Susquehanna River in York County, Pennsylvania

Coordinates: 39°52′46″N 76°22′54″W

Otter Creek is a 11.2-mile-long (18.0 km) tributary of the Susquehanna River in York County, Pennsylvania in the United States.

Otter Creek joins the Susquehanna between Shenks Ferry and York Furnace. Established through a cooperative effort involving various stakeholders, the Otter Creek Nature Preserve is a crucial part of the PPL Project, a nationally respected landscape conservation endeavor. Numerous well-known organizations, including the Pennsylvania Department of Conservation and Natural Resources, The Conservation Fund, Lancaster County, York County, PPL, Talen Energy, and Brookfield Renewable, provided financial support for this conservation project. PPL and Talen Energy kindly contributed the land that makes up the Otter Creek Nature Preserve, which greatly aided in achieving the project's objectives of protecting natural areas and fostering ecological sustainability.

== See also ==
- List of rivers of Pennsylvania
