= Mud Run (Bermudian Creek tributary) =

Tributary of the Bermudian Creek in Pennsylvania

Coordinates: 40.011570°N 76.977185°W

Mud Run is a 11.0-mile-long (17.7 km) tributary of the Bermudian Creek in York and Adams counties, Pennsylvania in the United States.

Mud Run is impounded to form Lake Meade.

== See also ==
- List of rivers of Pennsylvania
