= Rocky Hollow (Dunkard Creek tributary) =

Stream in Pennsylvania, USA

Rocky Hollow Tributary to Dunkard Creek
- Location of Rocky Hollow mouth Rocky Hollow (Dunkard Creek tributary) (the United States)

Location
- Country: United States
- State: Pennsylvania
- County: Greene County

Physical characteristics
- Source: Whiteley Creek divide
  - location: about 0.5 miles northwest of Poland Mines, Pennsylvania
  - coordinates: 39°47′12″N 079°57′12″W
  - elevation: 1,180 ft (360 m)
- Mouth: Dunkard Creek
  - location: about 2.0 miles west-southwest of Fieldsons Crossroads, Pennsylvania
  - coordinates: 39°46′15″N 079°57′12″W
  - elevation: 787 ft (240 m)
- Length: 1.98 mi (3.19 km)
- Basin size: 1.52 square miles (3.9 km^{2})
- Discharge
  - location: Dunkard Creek
  - average: 1.52 cu ft/s (0.043 m^{3}/s) at mouth with Dunkard Creek

Basin features
- Progression: southeast
- River system: Monongahela River
- Tributaries
  - left: unnamed tributaries
  - right: unnamed tributaries
- Bridges: Bobtown Road, Rocky Run Road, Bobtown Road, Hunting Hill Road, Donham Road (x2)

Rocky Hollow is a 1.98 mi (3.19 km) long second-order tributary to Dunkard Creek in Greene County.

== Course ==
Rocky Hollow rises about 0.5 miles northwest of Poland Mines, Pennsylvania and then flows southeasterly to join Dunkard Creek about 2 miles west-southwest of Fieldsons Crossroads, Pennsylvania.

== Watershed ==
Rocky Hollow drains 1.52 square miles (3.9 km^{2}) of area, receives about 42.9 in/year of precipitation, and is about 54.3% forested.

== See also ==
- List of rivers of Pennsylvania
