= McKinney Run (Brokenstraw Creek tributary) =

Stream in Pennsylvania, USA

McKinney Run Tributary to Brokenstraw Creek
- Location of McKinney Run mouth McKinney Run (Brokenstraw Creek tributary) (the United States)

Location
- Country: United States
- State: Pennsylvania
- County: Warren

Physical characteristics
- Source: divide between McKinney Run, Indian Camp Run and Irvine Run
  - location: about 2 miles northwest of Irvine, Pennsylvania
  - coordinates: 41°52′12″N 079°17′28″W
  - elevation: 1,605 ft (489 m)
- Mouth: Brokenstraw Creek
  - location: Irvine, Pennsylvania
  - coordinates: 41°50′47″N 079°16′47″W
  - elevation: 1,161 ft (354 m)
- Length: 1.79 mi (2.88 km)
- Basin size: 0.89 square miles (2.3 km^{2})
- Discharge
  - location: Brokenstraw Creek
  - average: 1.73 cu ft/s (0.049 m^{3}/s) at mouth with Brokenstraw Creek

Basin features
- Progression: Brokenstraw Creek → Allegheny River → Ohio River → Mississippi River → Gulf of Mexico
- River system: Allegheny River
- Tributaries
  - left: unnamed tributaries
  - right: unnamed tributaries
- Bridges: US 6

McKinney Run is a 1.79 mi (2.88 km) long tributary to Brokenstraw Creek that is classed as a 1st order stream on the EPA waters geoviewer site.

== Course ==
McKinney Run rises in Warren County, Pennsylvania about 2 miles northwest of Irvine and flows south to meet Brokenstraw Creek at Irvine.

== Watershed ==
McKinney Run drains 0.89 square miles (2.3 km^{2}) of the Pennsylvania High Plateau. The watershed receives an average of 44.5 in/year of precipitation and has a wetness index of 335.39. The watershed is about 87% forested.

== See also ==
- List of rivers of Pennsylvania
