= Murray Run =

Stream in Pennsylvania, U.S.

Coordinates: 40°33′11″N 77°57′42″W

Murray Run is a stream in the U.S. state of Pennsylvania. It is a tributary to Standing Stone Creek.

Murray Run has the name of a pioneer citizen.

== See also ==
- List of rivers of Pennsylvania
