= Drake Run (Youghiogheny River tributary) =

Stream in Pennsylvania, USA

Drake Run Tributary to Youghiogheny River
- Location of Drake Run mouth Drake Run (Youghiogheny River tributary) (the United States)

Location
- Country: United States
- State: Pennsylvania
- County: Somerset

Physical characteristics
- Source: Cranberry Glade Run divide
  - location: about 3 miles north of Draketown, Pennsylvania
  - coordinates: 39°53′48″N 079°22′06″W
  - elevation: 2,310 ft (700 m)
- Mouth: Youghiogheny River
  - location: about 0.75 miles northwest of Huston, Pennsylvania
  - coordinates: 39°50′19″N 079°23′07″W
  - elevation: 1,298 ft (396 m)
- Length: 3.58 mi (5.76 km)
- Basin size: 16.21 square miles (42.0 km^{2})
- Discharge
  - location: Youghiogheny River
  - average: 20.47 cu ft/s (0.580 m^{3}/s) at mouth with Youghiogheny River

Basin features
- Progression: generally south
- River system: Monongahela River
- Tributaries
  - left: unnamed tributaries
  - right: Little Glade Run
- Bridges: Jersey Hollow Road, Back Road (x2), Draketown Road, Conn Road, Draketown Road

Drake Run is a 3.58 mi (5.76 km) long 1st order tributary to the Youghiogheny River in Somerset County, Pennsylvania.

== Variant names ==
According to the Geographic Names Information System, it has also been known historically as:

- Drakes Run

== Course ==
Drake Run rises about 3 miles north of Draketown, Pennsylvania. The river then flows south to join the Youghiogheny River about 0.75 of a mile northwest of Huston.

== Watershed ==
Drake Run drains 16.21 square miles (42.0 km^{2}) of area and receives about 48.3 in/year of precipitation. Drake Run has a wetness index of 374.92, and is about 92% forested.

== See also ==
- List of rivers of Pennsylvania
