= Brady Run (Beaver River tributary) =

River in Pennsylvania

Brady Run Tributary to Beaver River
- Location of Brady Run mouth Brady Run (Beaver River tributary) (the United States)

Location
- Country: United States of America
- State: Pennsylvania
- County: Beaver

Physical characteristics
- Source: divide between Brady Run and North Fork Little Beaver Creek
  - location: about 3 miles west of Beaver Falls, Pennsylvania
  - coordinates: 40°46′31″N 080°22′08″W
  - elevation: 1,160 ft (350 m)
- Mouth: Beaver River
  - location: Fallston, Pennsylvania
  - coordinates: 40°42′56″N 080°18′14″W
  - elevation: 690 ft (210 m)
- Length: 5.68 mi (9.14 km)
- Basin size: 25.82 square miles (66.9 km^{2})
- Discharge
  - average: 25.71 cu ft/s (0.728 m^{3}/s) at mouth with Beaver River

Basin features
- Progression: Beaver River → Ohio River → Mississippi River → Gulf of Mexico
- River system: Beaver River
- Tributaries
  - left: unnamed tributaries
  - right: North Branch Brady Run; South Branch Brady Run

Brady Run is a tributary of the Beaver River in western Pennsylvania. The stream rises in central Beaver County then flows southeast entering the Beaver River at Fallston, Pennsylvania. The watershed is roughly 21% agricultural, 61% forested and the rest is other uses.
