= Jenkins Run (Beaver River tributary) =

River in Pennsylvania

Jenkins Run Tributary to Beaver River
- Location of Jenkins Run mouth Jenkins Run (Beaver River tributary) (the United States)

Location
- Country: United States of America
- State: Pennsylvania
- County: Lawrence

Physical characteristics
- Source: divide between Jenkins Run and North Fork Little Beaver Creek
  - location: about 1 mile SE of Derringer Corners, Pennsylvania
  - coordinates: 40°55′00″N 080°26′49″W
  - elevation: 1,180 ft (360 m)
- Mouth: Beaver River
  - location: about 1 mile south of Moravia, Pennsylvania
  - coordinates: 40°54′35″N 080°22′04″W
  - elevation: 755 ft (230 m)
- Length: 5.34 mi (8.59 km)
- Basin size: 5.69 square miles (14.7 km^{2})
- Discharge
  - average: 6.48 cu ft/s (0.183 m^{3}/s) at mouth with Beaver River

Basin features
- Progression: Beaver River → Ohio River → Mississippi River → Gulf of Mexico
- River system: Beaver River
- Tributaries
  - left: unnamed tributaries
  - right: unnamed tributaries

Jenkins Run is a tributary of the Beaver River in western Pennsylvania. The stream rises in western Lawrence County and flows east entering the Beaver River south of Moravia, Pennsylvania. The watershed is roughly 60% agricultural, 31% forested and the rest is other uses.
