= Rough Hollow =

Valley in Missouri, United States

Coordinates: 36.520352°N 94.218263°W

Rough Hollow is a valley in McDonald County in the U.S. state of Missouri.

Rough Hollow was named for the broken terrain of the valley.

== See Also ==
- Geography of Missouri
- Geography of the United States
