= Charley Run (Allegheny River tributary) =

Waterway in Venango County, Pennsylvania

Charley Run Tributary to Allegheny River
- Location within Pennsylvania Location within the United States

Location
- Country: United States
- State: Pennsylvania
- County: Venango
- City: Oil City

Physical characteristics
- Source: Read Run divide
  - location: about 2 miles north of Oil City, Pennsylvania
  - coordinates: 41°27′12″N 079°44′26″W
  - elevation: 1,440 ft (440 m)
- Mouth: Allegheny River
  - location: Oil City, Pennsylvania
  - coordinates: 41°25′35″N 079°43′32″W
  - elevation: 974 ft (297 m)
- Length: 1.78 mi (2.86 km)
- Basin size: 1.35 square miles (3.5 km^{2})
- Discharge
  - location: Allegheny River
  - average: 2.50 cu ft/s (0.071 m^{3}/s) at mouth with Allegheny River

Basin features
- Progression: south-southeast
- River system: Allegheny River
- Tributaries
  - left: unnamed tributaries
  - right: unnamed tributaries
- Bridges: US 62

Charley Run is a 1.78 mi (2.86 km) long 1st order tributary to the Allegheny River in Venango County, Pennsylvania.

== Course ==
Charley Run rises about 2 miles north of Oil City, Pennsylvania, and then flows south-southeast to join the Allegheny River at Oil City.

== Watershed ==
Charley Run drains 1.35 square miles (3.5 km^{2}) of area, receives about 44.4 in/year of precipitation, and has a wetness index of 373.89 and is about 90% forested.

== Additional Maps ==
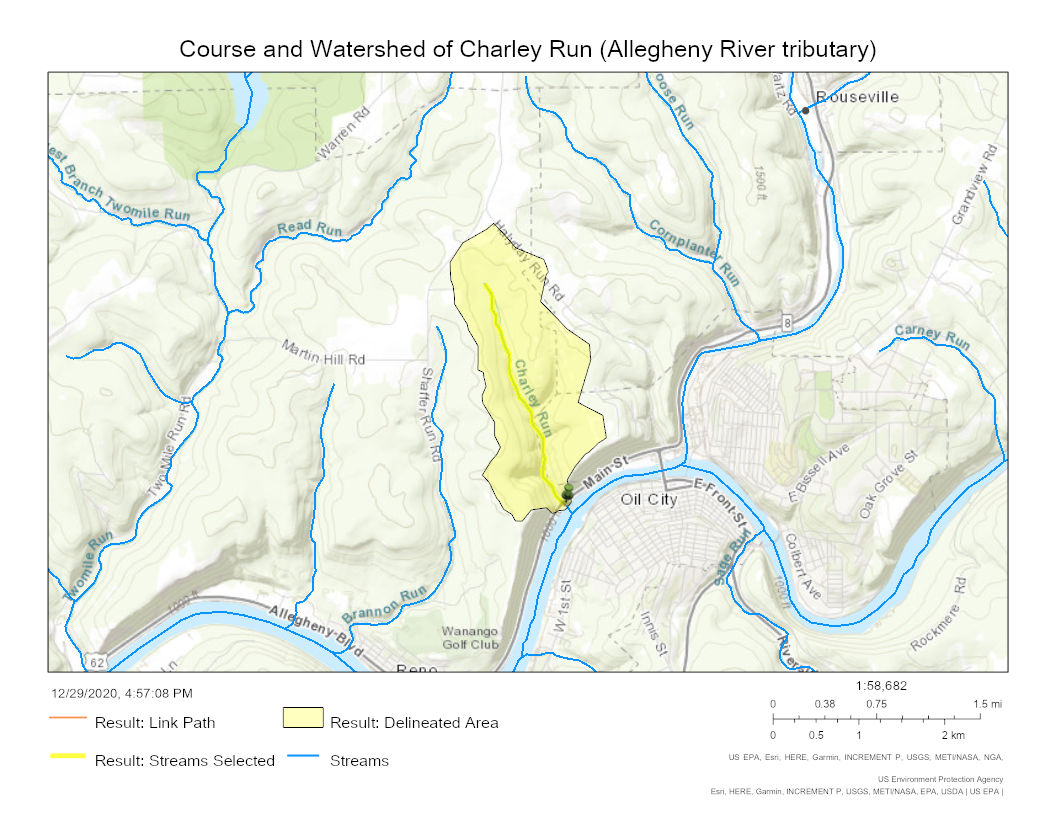
Course and Watershed of Charley Run (Allegheny River tributary) in Venango County, Pennsylvania
