= Edwards Run (Beaver River tributary) =

River in Pennsylvania

Edwards Run Tributary to Beaver River
- Location of Edwards Run mouth Edwards Run (Beaver River tributary) (the United States)

Location
- Country: United States of America
- State: Pennsylvania
- County: Lawrence

Physical characteristics
- Source: divide between Edwards Run and North Fork Little Beaver Creek
  - location: about 2 miles SE of Derringer Corners, Pennsylvania
  - coordinates: 40°55′12″N 080°26′04″W
  - elevation: 1,230 ft (370 m)
- Mouth: Beaver River
  - location: Moravia, Pennsylvania
  - coordinates: 40°55′25″N 080°22′19″W
  - elevation: 758 ft (231 m)
- Length: 3.82 mi (6.15 km)
- Basin size: 3.59 square miles (9.3 km^{2})
- Discharge
  - average: 4.17 cu ft/s (0.118 m^{3}/s) at mouth with Beaver River

Basin features
- Progression: Beaver River → Ohio River → Mississippi River → Gulf of Mexico
- River system: Beaver River
- Tributaries
  - left: unnamed tributaries
  - right: unnamed tributaries

Edwards Run is a tributary of the Beaver River in western Pennsylvania. The stream rises in western Lawrence County and flows east entering the Beaver River at Moravia, Pennsylvania. The watershed is roughly 60% agricultural, 33% forested and the rest is other uses.
