= Virgin Run =

Stream in Pennsylvania, USA

Virgin Run Tributary to Youghiogheny River
- Location of Virgin Run mouth Virgin Run (the United States)

Location
- Country: United States
- State: Pennsylvania
- County: Fayette

Physical characteristics
- Source: Allen Run divide
  - location: pond in Flatwoods, Pennsylvania
  - coordinates: 40°01′30″N 079°43′37″W
  - elevation: 1,320 ft (400 m)
- Mouth: Youghiogheny River
  - location: about 2 miles southeast of Perryopolis, Pennsylvania
  - coordinates: 40°03′45″N 079°42′35″W
  - elevation: 837 ft (255 m)
- Length: 3.44 mi (5.54 km)
- Basin size: 4.75 square miles (12.3 km^{2})
- Discharge
  - location: Youghiogheny River
  - average: 7.06 cu ft/s (0.200 m^{3}/s) at mouth with Youghiogheny River

Basin features
- Progression: Youghiogheny River → Monongahela River → Ohio River → Mississippi River → Gulf of Mexico
- River system: Monongahela River
- Tributaries
  - left: unnamed tributaries
  - right: unnamed tributaries
- Waterbodies: Virgin Run Lake
- Bridges: Town Country Road, PA 201, Maplewood Road

Virgin Run is a 3.44 mi (5.54 km) long 2nd order tributary to the Youghiogheny River in Fayette County, Pennsylvania. This is the only stream of this name in the United States.

== Variant names ==
According to the Geographic Names Information System, it has also been known historically as:

- Virgins Run

== Course ==
Virgin Run rises in a pond in Flatwoods, Pennsylvania, and then flows northeast to join the Youghiogheny River about 2 miles southeast of Perryopolis.

== Watershed ==
Virgin Run drains 4.75 square miles (12.3 km^{2}) of area, receives about 43.1 in/year of precipitation, has a wetness index of 384.82, and is about 53% forested.
