= Bear Creek (Allegheny River tributary) =

- Location within Pennsylvania Location within the United States

Physical characteristics
- Source
  - coordinates: 40.9508969°N 79.7956068°W
- Mouth
  - coordinates: 41.0828404°N 79.6736598°W

Bear Creek is a stream in the U.S. state of Pennsylvania. It is a tributary to the Allegheny River.

Bear Creek was so named on account of the many bears which once were seen in the area.
