= Pollock Run =

Stream in Pennsylvania, USA

Pollock Run Tributary to Youghiogheny River
- Location of Pollock Run mouth Pollock Run (the United States)

Location
- Country: United States
- State: Pennsylvania
- County: Westmoreland; Allegheny

Physical characteristics
- Source: Cedar Creek divide
  - location: Rankins Corners, Pennsylvania
  - coordinates: 40°10′09″N 079°49′12″W
  - elevation: 1,060 ft (320 m)
- Mouth: Youghiogheny River
  - location: Smithdale, Pennsylvania
  - coordinates: 40°13′40″N 079°47′19″W
  - elevation: 739 ft (225 m)
- Length: 5.55 mi (8.93 km)
- Basin size: 8.12 square miles (21.0 km^{2})
- Discharge
  - location: Youghiogheny River
  - average: 9.16 cu ft/s (0.259 m^{3}/s) at mouth with Youghiogheny River

Basin features
- Progression: Youghiogheny River → Monongahela River → Ohio River → Mississippi River → Gulf of Mexico
- River system: Monongahela River
- Tributaries
  - left: unnamed tributaries
  - right: unnamed tributaries
- Bridges: Fallsburg Road, PA 51, PA 201, Moores Road, PA 136, Coal Hollow Road (x3), Margaret Street (x2)

Pollock Run is a 5.55 mi (8.93 km) long 2nd order tributary to the Youghiogheny River in Allegheny County, Pennsylvania. This is the only stream of this name in the United States.

== Course ==
Pollock Run rises at Rankins Corners, Pennsylvania in Westmoreland County, and then flows southeast and then turns north to join the Youghiogheny River just into Allegheny County at Smithdale.

== Watershed ==
Pollock Run drains 8.12 square miles (21.0 km^{2}) of area, receives about 39.7 in/year of precipitation, has a wetness index of 335.80, and is about 40% forested.

== Natural history ==
Pollock Run is the location of Pollock Run Slopes BDA, which contains a remnant Mesic Central Forest community and a rare plant species.
