= Crawford Run (Youghiogheny River tributary) =

Stream in Pennsylvania, USA

Crawford Run Tributary to Youghiogheny River
- Location of Crawford Run mouth Crawford Run (Youghiogheny River tributary) (the United States)

Location
- Country: United States
- State: Pennsylvania
- County: Westmoreland; Allegheny

Physical characteristics
- Source: Long Run divide
  - location: about 0.75 miles southwest of Hahntown, Pennsylvania
  - coordinates: 40°18′47″N 079°44′37″W
  - elevation: 1,140 ft (350 m)
- Mouth: Youghiogheny River
  - location: Robbins, Pennsylvania
  - coordinates: 40°17′53″N 079°47′17″W
  - elevation: 736 ft (224 m)
- Length: 2.80 mi (4.51 km)
- Basin size: 1.97 square miles (5.1 km^{2})
- Discharge
  - location: Youghiogheny River
  - average: 2.24 cu ft/s (0.063 m^{3}/s) at mouth with Youghiogheny River

Basin features
- Progression: Youghiogheny River → Monongahela River → Ohio River → Mississippi River → Gulf of Mexico
- River system: Monongahela River
- Tributaries
  - left: unnamed tributaries
  - right: unnamed tributaries
- Bridges: Thoroughbred Drive, Robbins Station Road (x2), Turner Valley Road

Crawford Run is a 2.80 mi (4.51 km) long 1st order tributary to the Youghiogheny River in Allegheny County, Pennsylvania.

== Course ==
Crawford Run rises about 0.75 miles southwest of Hahntown, Pennsylvania, and then flows west and southwest barely into Allegheny County to join the Youghiogheny River at Robbins.

== Watershed ==
Crawford Run drains 1.97 square miles (5.1 km^{2}) of area, receives about 39.4 in/year of precipitation, has a wetness index of 329.07, and is about 54% forested.
