= Gillespie Run (Youghiogheny River tributary) =

Stream in Pennsylvania, US

Gillespie Run Tributary to Youghiogheny River
- Location of Gillespie Run mouth Gillespie Run (Youghiogheny River tributary) (the United States)

Location
- Country: United States
- State: Pennsylvania
- County: Allegheny

Physical characteristics
- Source: Beckets Run divide
  - location: about 2 miles west-southwest of Mustard, Pennsylvania
  - coordinates: 40°13′28″N 079°51′34″W
  - elevation: 1,115 ft (340 m)
- Mouth: Youghiogheny River
  - location: Sutersville, Pennsylvania
  - coordinates: 40°14′31″N 079°48′13″W
  - elevation: 738 ft (225 m)
- Length: 4.11 mi (6.61 km)
- Basin size: 8.32 square miles (21.5 km^{2})
- Discharge
  - location: Youghiogheny River
  - average: 8.25 cu ft/s (0.234 m^{3}/s) at mouth with Youghiogheny River

Basin features
- Progression: Youghiogheny River → Monongahela River → Ohio River → Mississippi River → Gulf of Mexico
- River system: Monongahela River
- Tributaries
  - left: Douglass Run
  - right: unnamed tributaries
- Bridges: Pond Lane, Guffey Road, PA 51, Scenery Drive, Pineview Drive (x4), Berdar Drive, Douglass Run Road (x2)

Gillespie Run is a 4.11 mi (6.61 km) long 3rd order tributary to the Youghiogheny River in Allegheny County, Pennsylvania.

== Course ==
Gillespie Run rises about 2 miles west-southwest of Mustard, Pennsylvania, and then flows northeasterly to join the Youghiogheny River across from Sutersville.

== Watershed ==
Gillespie Run drains 8.32 square miles (21.5 km^{2}) of area, receives about 39.5 in/year of precipitation, has a wetness index of 318.16, and is about 62% forested.
