= Browneller Run =

Stream in Pennsylvania, USA

Browneller Run Tributary to Youghiogheny River
- Location of Browneller Run mouth Browneller Run (the United States)

Location
- Country: United States
- State: Pennsylvania
- County: Westmoreland; Fayette

Physical characteristics
- Source: Lutz Creek divide
  - location: about 3 miles northeast of Arnold City, Pennsylvania
  - coordinates: 40°07′46″N 079°47′09″W
  - elevation: 1,098 ft (335 m)
- Mouth: Youghiogheny River
  - location: across the Youighiogheny River from Banning, Pennsylvania
  - coordinates: 40°7′17″N 079°45′14″W
  - elevation: 771 ft (235 m)
- Length: 1.96 mi (3.15 km)
- Basin size: 1.94 square miles (5.0 km^{2})
- Discharge
  - location: Youghiogheny River
  - average: 2.44 cu ft/s (0.069 m^{3}/s) at mouth with Youghiogheny River

Basin features
- Progression: Youghiogheny River → Monongahela River → Ohio River → Mississippi River → Gulf of Mexico
- River system: Monongahela River
- Tributaries
  - left: unnamed tributaries
  - right: unnamed tributaries
- Bridges: Harmony Church Road, PA 51, Wick Haven Road, Wickhaven Hollow Road (x2)

Browneller Run is a 1.96 mi (3.15 km) long 2nd order tributary to the Youghiogheny River in Fayette County, Pennsylvania. This is the only stream of this name in the United States.

== Course ==
Browneller Run rises about 3 miles northeast of Arnold City, Pennsylvania in Westmoreland County, and then flows southeast into Fayette County to join the Youghiogheny River across from Banning.

== Watershed ==
Browneller Run drains 1.94 square miles (5.0 km^{2}) of area, receives about 40.6 in/year of precipitation, has a wetness index of 317.83, and is about 39% forested.

== Natural history ==
Browneller Run is the location of Brownller Run Confluence BDA, which contains a mature upland forest and a riverine forest as well as a rare plant species.
