= Bell Creek (Pine Creek tributary) =

Physical characteristics
- Source
  - location: border between Sugarloaf Township, Columbia County, Pennsylvania and Fairmount Township, Luzerne County, Pennsylvania
  - elevation: between 1,280 and 1,300 feet (390 and 400 m)
- Mouth
  - location: Pine Creek in Huntington Township, Luzerne County, Pennsylvania
  - coordinates: 41°12′56″N 76°16′41″W
  - elevation: 833 ft (254 m)
- Length: 4.0 mi (6.4 km)

Basin features
- Progression: Pine Creek → Huntington Creek → Fishing Creek → Susquehanna River → Chesapeake Bay
- Tributaries
  - right: two unnamed tributaries, Ashs West Branch

Bell Creek is a tributary of Pine Creek in Luzerne County, Pennsylvania, in the United States. It is approximately 4.0 miles (6.4 km) long and flows through Fairmount Township and Huntington Township. The creek is a freestone stream in the ridge and valley physiographic province. Wild trout naturally reproduce within the creek. It has one named tributary, which is known as Ashs West Branch, and two unnamed tributaries.

== Course ==
Bell Creek begins on the border between Sugarloaf Township, Columbia County and Fairmount Township, Luzerne County. It flows east into Fairmount Township for a short distance before gradually turning southeast. After several tenths of a mile, the creek passes through Fairmount Springs and shortly afterwards turns south. Several tenths of a mile further downstream, it turns south-southeast for a few miles, entering Huntington Township and receiving its only named tributary, Ashs West Branch, from the right. The creek then turns east for a few tenths of a mile before reaching its confluence with Pine Creek.

=== Tributaries ===
Bell Creek has one named tributary, which is known as Ashs West Branch. That tributary is approximately 3.5 miles (5.6 km) long. Bell Creek also has two unnamed tributaries, both of which enter it from the right.

== Geography and geology ==
The elevation near the mouth of Bell Creek is 833 feet (254 m) above sea level. The elevation near the creek's source is between 1,280 and 1,300 feet (390 and 400 m) above sea level.

Bell Creek is in the ridge and valley phyoigraphic province. The creek is a freestone stream.

== Watershed ==
The mouth of Bell Creek is in the United States Geological Survey quadrangle of Stillwater. However, its source is in the quadrangle of Red Rock.

== History ==
Bell Creek was entered into the Geographic Names Information System on August 2, 1979. Its identifier in the Geographic Names Information System is 1169145.

A stone arch bridge across Bell Creek in Huntington Township was proposed in 1901. It was to be located near J.T. Hess and would cost $250. A similar bridge over the creek in the same township was also proposed nearly two years earlier, in 1899. However, this bridge was to cost $700.

== Biology ==
Wild trout naturally reproduce in Bell Creek from its headwaters downstream to its mouth. They also do so in the tributary Ashs West Branch.

== See also ==
- Wasp Branch, next tributary of Pine Creek going upstream
- List of tributaries of Fishing Creek (North Branch Susquehanna River)
- List of rivers of Pennsylvania
