= Little Pine Creek (Luzerne and Columbia Counties, Pennsylvania) =

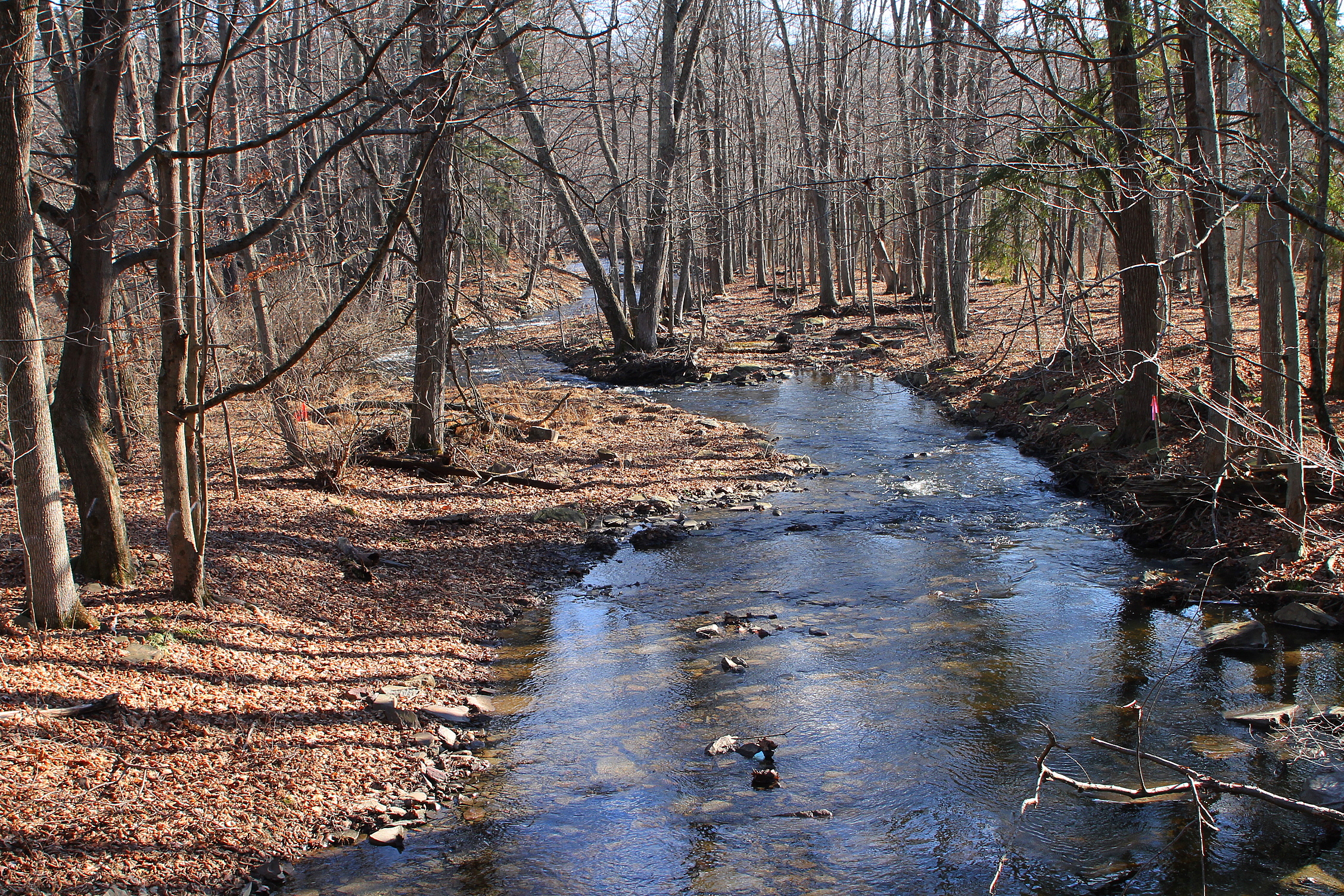
- Little Pine Creek in Fishing Creek Township

Physical characteristics
- Source
  - location: Bear Swamp in northwestern Huntington Township, Luzerne County, Pennsylvania
  - elevation: 940 ft (290 m)
- Mouth
  - location: Pine Creek in Fishing Creek Township, Columbia County, Pennsylvania
  - coordinates: 41°08′50″N 76°17′15″W
  - elevation: 718 ft (219 m)
- Length: 4.8 mi (7.7 km)
- Basin size: 7.15 sq mi (18.5 km^{2})

Basin features
- Progression: Pine Creek → Huntington Creek

Little Pine Creek is a tributary of Pine Creek in Luzerne County and Columbia County, in Pennsylvania, in the United States. It is approximately 4.8 miles (7.7 km) long and flows through Huntington Township and New Columbus in Luzerne County and Fishing Creek Township in Columbia County. The watershed of the creek has an area of 7.15 square miles (18.5 km^{2}). A number of bridges have been built over the creek and a fulling mill historically existed on it. The creek is inhabited by wild trout.

== Course ==
Little Pine Creek begins in Bear Swamp in northwestern Huntington Township, Luzerne County. It flows south-southeast for several tenths of a mile, crossing Pennsylvania Route 239 and passing through a pond. The creek enters New Columbus and continues flowing roughly due south, getting progressively closer to the border between Luzerne County and Columbia County over the next mile or two (two or three kilometers). It receives two unnamed tributaries in this stretch before exiting New Columbus and Luzerne County.

Upon exiting Luzerne County, Little Pine Creek enters Fishing Creek Township, Columbia County. The creek flows south for a few tenths of a mile before briefly turning east-southeast and then turning south. After some distance, it turns east for a short distance and then turns southwest. After crossing Bendertown Road, the creek turns south-southeast and then curves eastwards for several tenths of a mile until it reaches its confluence with Pine Creek.

Little Pine Creek joins Pine Creek 2.02 miles (3.25 km) upstream of its mouth.

== Geography and watershed ==
The elevation near the mouth of Little Pine Creek is 718 feet (219 m) above sea level. The elevation of the creek's source is just over 940 feet (290 m) above sea level.

The watershed of Little Pine Creek has an area of 7.15 square miles (18.5 km^{2}). Both the mouth and the source of the creek is in the USGS Stillwater 7.5 minute quadrangle.

== History ==
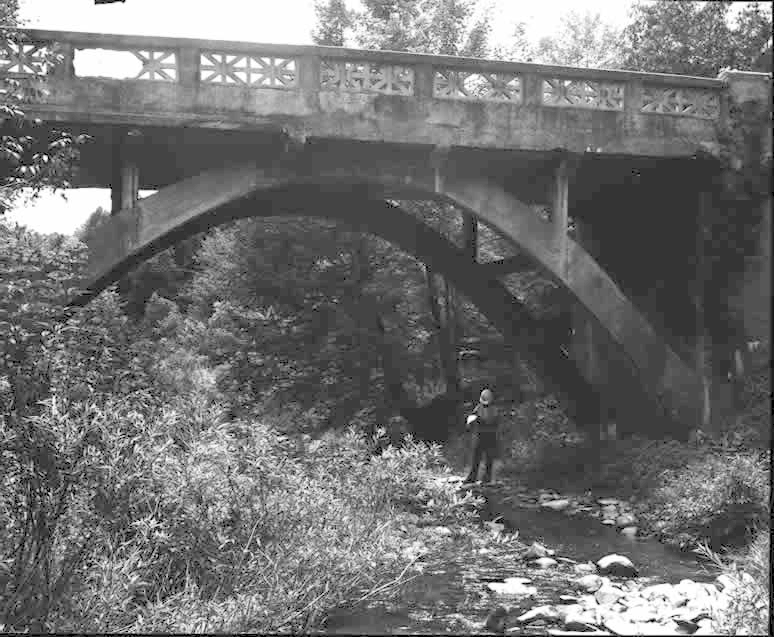
A bridge over Little Pine Creek in 1982

Little Pine Creek was added to the Geographic Names Information System on August 2, 1979. Its identifier in the Geographic Names Information System is 1179634.

A man by the name of Kennedy constructed a small fulling mill on Little Pine Creek in 1820. However, it was not operational for a long period of time. Little Pine Creek was designated as a public "highway" (i.e. waterway) from its mouth in Columbia County to New Columbus in Luzerne County on April 4, 1837. The Water Supply Commission of Pennsylvania approved the construction of a bridge carrying the Bendertown-Shickshinny Road over the creek by 1915.

A prestressed box beam bridge was built over Little Pine Creek in Columbia County in 1998. It carries State Route 1026 and is 66.9 feet (20.4 m) long. A masonry arch bridge was built over the creek in Luzerne County in 1927. It carries T-486 (Valley View Road) and is 21.0 feet (6.4 m) long. A bridge in Fishing Creek Township was built over the creek in 1915.

== Biology ==
Wild trout naturally reproduce in Little Pine Creek. The creek is on the Pennsylvania Fish and Boat Commission's list of wild trout streams.

== See also ==
- List of tributaries of Fishing Creek (North Branch Susquehanna River)
