= Crooked Creek (Kitchen Creek tributary) =

River in Pennsylvania, United States

Coordinates: 41°17′19″N 76°16′08″W

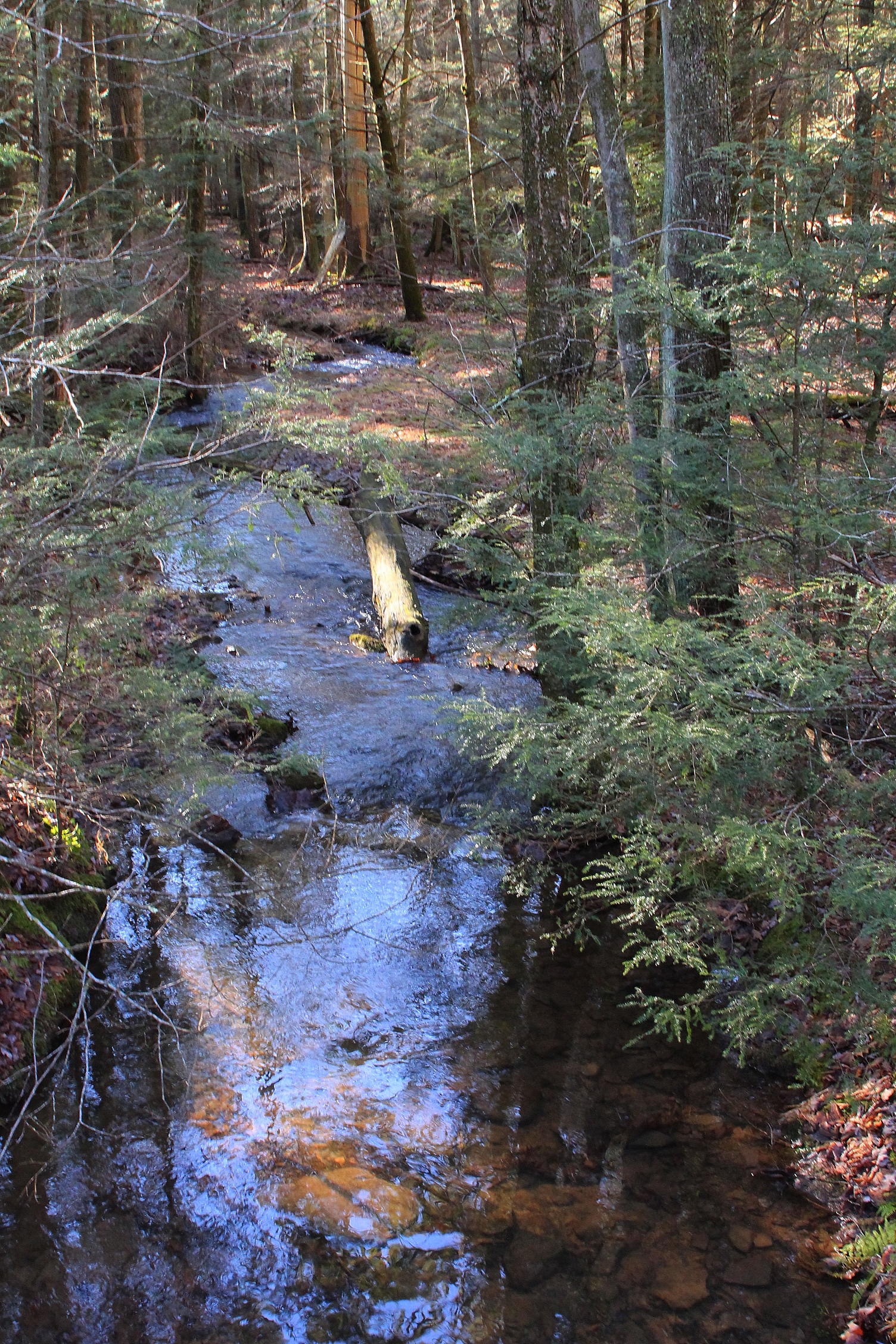
- Crooked Creek in Ricketts Glen State Park

Physical characteristics
- Source
  - location: pond at the base of North Mountain in Fairmount Township, Luzerne County, Pennsylvania
  - elevation: between 1,340 and 1,360 feet (410 and 410 m)
- Mouth
  - location: Kitchen Creek in Fairmount Township, Luzerne County, Pennsylvania
  - elevation: 994 ft (303 m)
- Length: 1.8 mi (2.9 km)
- Basin size: 1.20 mi^{2} (3.1 km^{2})

Basin features
- Progression: Kitchen Creek → Huntington Creek → Fishing Creek → Susquehanna River → Chesapeake Bay
- Tributaries
  - left: one unnamed tributary

Crooked Creek is a tributary of Kitchen Creek in Luzerne County, Pennsylvania, in the United States. It is approximately 1.8 miles (2.9 km) long and flows through Fairmount Township. The watershed of the creek has an area of 1.20 square miles (3.1 km^{2}) and there is one named tributary. The creek is considered to be Class A Wild Trout Waters and a portion of it flows through Ricketts Glen State Park. Wisconsinan Till, Wisconsinan Outwash, and alluvium can be found in its vicinity.

== Course ==
Crooked Creek begins in a pond at the base of North Mountain, just west of the community of Ripple and not far from Ricketts Glen State Park in Fairmount Township. The creek flows southwest for several hundred feet, crossing Pennsylvania Route 118. It then turns west-southwest for more than a mile, its valley gradually deepening. It crosses Bethel Hill Road and receives an unnamed tributary from the left. The creek eventually turns south and after a few tenths of a mile, reaches its confluence with Kitchen Creek.

Crooked Creek joins Kitchen Creek 4.80 miles (7.72 km) upstream of its mouth.

== Hydrology, geography and geology ==
The concentration of alkalinity in the waters of Crooked Creek is 7 milligrams per liter.

The elevation near the mouth of Crooked Creek is 994 feet (303 m) above sea level. The elevation of the creek's source is between 1,340 and 1,360 feet (410 and 410 m).

For much of its length, Crooked Creek flows through Wisconsinan Till, Wisconsinan Outwash, and alluvium. The Wisconsinian Till is a glacial till that is more than 6 feet (1.8 m) thick. The Wisconsinian Outwash consists of stratified sand and gravel and ranges from 6 feet (1.8 m) to more than 30 feet (9.1 m) thick. The alluvium contains stratified silt, sand, and gravel, and is typically more than 6 feet (1.8 m) thick. Bedrock made of shale and sandstone can also be found in the vicinity of the creek in its lower reaches. The Wisconsinian Till is prevalent in the creek's upper reaches.

== Watershed ==
The watershed of Crooked Creek has an area of 1.20 square miles (3.1 km^{2}). The creek is in the United States Geological Survey quadrangles of Red Rock and Sweet Valley. Its mouth is in the former and its source is in the latter. The lower and middle reaches of the creek are in Ricketts Glen State Park.

== History ==
Crooked Creek was entered into the Geographic Names Information System on August 2, 1979. Its identifier in the Geographic Names Information System is 1192314.

== Biology ==
Crooked Creek is considered by the Pennsylvania Fish and Boat Commission to be Class A Wild Trout Waters for brook trout. The creek holds this designation for its entire length. The Pennsylvania Fish and Boat Commission describes Class A Wild Trout Waters as being able to "support a population of naturally produced trout of sufficient size and abundance to support a long-term and rewarding sport fishery" and also not being stocked with fish.

== See also ==
- Maple Run, next tributary of Kitchen Creek going downstream
- Boston Run, next tributary of Kitchen Creek going upstream
- List of tributaries of Fishing Creek (North Branch Susquehanna River)
