= Cambra, Pennsylvania =

Unincorporated community in Pennsylvania, US

- Unincorporated community
- Location within Pennsylvania Location within the United States
- Coordinates: 41°11′53″N 76°18′21″W
- Country: United States
- State: Pennsylvania
- County: Luzerne
- Township: Huntington
- Elevation: 1,033 ft (315 m)
- Time zone: UTC-5 (Eastern (EST))
  - Summer (DST): UTC-4 (EDT)
- ZIP code: 18611
- Area codes: 272 & 570
- GNIS feature ID: 1170957

Cambra is an unincorporated community in Huntington Township, Luzerne County, Pennsylvania, United States. The community is near Pennsylvania Route 239 and situated 1.8 miles (2.9 km) north-northwest of New Columbus. Cambra has a post office with ZIP code 18611, which opened on June 10, 1822.
