= Maple Spring Brook =

Maple Spring Brook Maple Spring Branch, Maple Spring Run
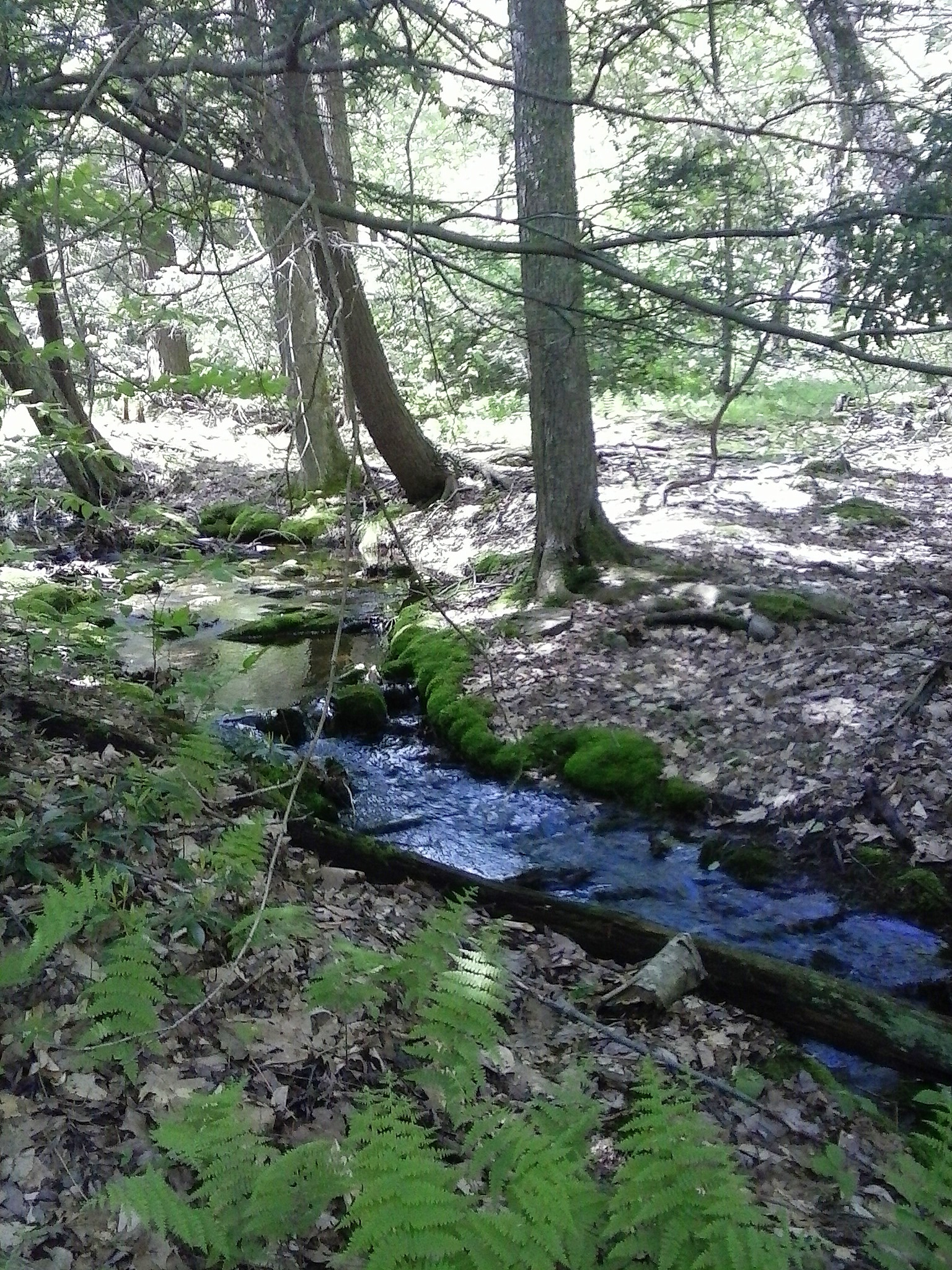
- Headwaters of Maple Spring Brook

Physical characteristics
- Source
  - location: mountain in Fairmount Township, Luzerne County, Pennsylvania
  - elevation: between 2,100 and 2,120 feet (640 and 650 m)
- Mouth
  - location: Kitchen Creek in Fairmount Township, Luzerne County, Pennsylvania
  - coordinates: 41°18′34″N 76°16′34″W
  - elevation: 1,325 ft (404 m)
- Length: 0.6 mi (0.97 km)
- Basin size: 0.40 mi^{2} (1.0 km^{2})

Basin features
- Progression: Kitchen Creek → Huntington Creek → Fishing Creek → Susquehanna River → Chesapeake Bay

Maple Spring Brook (also known as Maple Spring Branch or Maple Spring Run) is a tributary of Kitchen Creek in Luzerne County, Pennsylvania, in the United States. It is approximately 0.6 miles (0.97 km) long and flows through Fairmount Township. The watershed of the stream has an area of 0.40 square miles (1.0 km^{2}). There is a waterfall in the stream's upper reaches and hemlock trees occur in the vicinity. The surficial geology in the area consists mainly of Wisconsinan Till, Wisconsinan Bouldery Till, wetlands, and bedrock consisting of shale and sandstone.

== Course ==
Maple Spring Brook begins on a mountain in Fairmount Township, not far from Red Rock Mountain. It flows southeast for a short distance and enters a deep valley before turning south. The stream then turns east-southeast for a short distance before reaching its confluence with Kitchen Creek.

Maple Spring Brook joins Kitchen Creek 6.40 miles (10.30 km) upstream of its mouth.

== Geography and geology ==
The elevation near the mouth of Maple Spring Brook is 1,325 feet (404 m) above sea level. The elevation near the source of the stream is between 2,100 and 2,120 feet (640 and 650 m) above sea level.

The surficial geology in the vicinity of the lower reaches of Maple Spring Brook mainly features a glacial or resedimented till known as Wisconsinan Till. Further upstream, there is bedrock consisting of sandstone and shale. Near the headwaters, there is Wisconsinan Bouldery Till and a patch of wetland.

== Watershed and biology ==
The watershed of Maple Spring Brook has an area of 0.40 square miles (1.0 km^{2}). The stream is entirely within the United States Geological Survey quadrangle of Red Rock.

There is a waterfall with a height of 15 feet (4.6 m) on Maple Spring Brook. It is in the stream's upper reaches and is situated several hundred feet downstream of the Ganoga View Trail.

A white ash tree with a height of 139.7 feet (42.6 m) was observed in the vicinity of Maple Spring Brook on September 15, 2004. Its height was measured via the laser-clinometer method. There are numerous hemlock trees in the vicinity of the stream's upper reaches.

== History and recreation ==
Maple Spring Brook was entered into the Geographic Names Information System on August 2, 1979. Its identifier in the Geographic Names Information System is 1180366.

Maple Spring Branch is in Ricketts Glen State Park. The Ganoga View Trail in Ricketts Glen State Park crosses the stream near its headwaters.

== See also ==
- Boston Run, next tributary of Kitchen Creek going downstream
- Shingle Cabin Brook, next tributary of Kitchen Creek going upstream
- List of rivers of Pennsylvania
