= Pine Creek (Huntington Creek tributary) =

River in Pennsylvania, United States

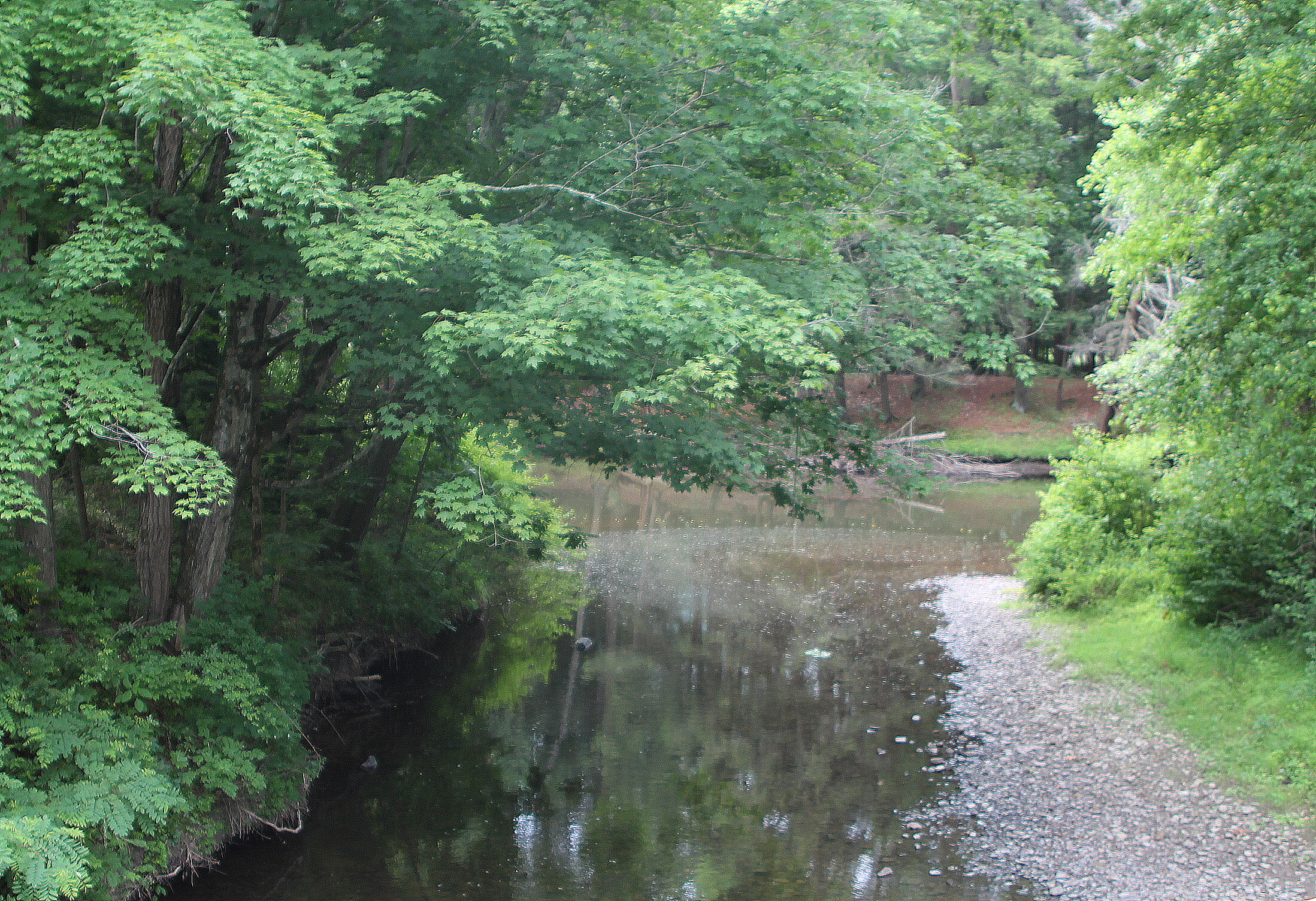
- The mouth of Pine Creek

Physical characteristics
- Source
  - location: Fairmont Township, Luzerne County, Pennsylvania
- Mouth
  - location: Huntington Creek in Fishing Creek Township, Columbia County, Pennsylvania
  - coordinates: 41°07′50″N 76°18′09″W
  - elevation: 670 ft (200 m)
- Length: 12.4 mi (20.0 km)
- Basin size: 30.7 mi^{2} (80 km^{2})

Basin features
- Progression: Huntington Creek → Fishing Creek → Susquehanna River → Chesapeake Bay
- Tributaries
  - left: Brish Run, Wasp Branch
  - right: Bell Branch, Little Pine Creek

Pine Creek is a tributary of Huntington Creek in Luzerne County and Columbia County, in Pennsylvania, in the United States. It is approximately 12.4 miles (20.0 km) long and flows through Fairmont Township, Huntington Township, and New Columbus in Luzerne County; and Fishing Creek Township in Columbia County. The creek's watershed has an area of 30.7 square miles and is located in Columbia and Luzerne Counties. Its tributaries include Bell Branch and Little Pine Creek. The vicinity of the creek was settled in the late 1700s. The main industries in the watershed in the early 1900s were timber and agriculture. Pine Creek is designated as a coldwater fishery and a migratory fishery. Northern myotis bats also inhabit areas near the creek.

== Course ==
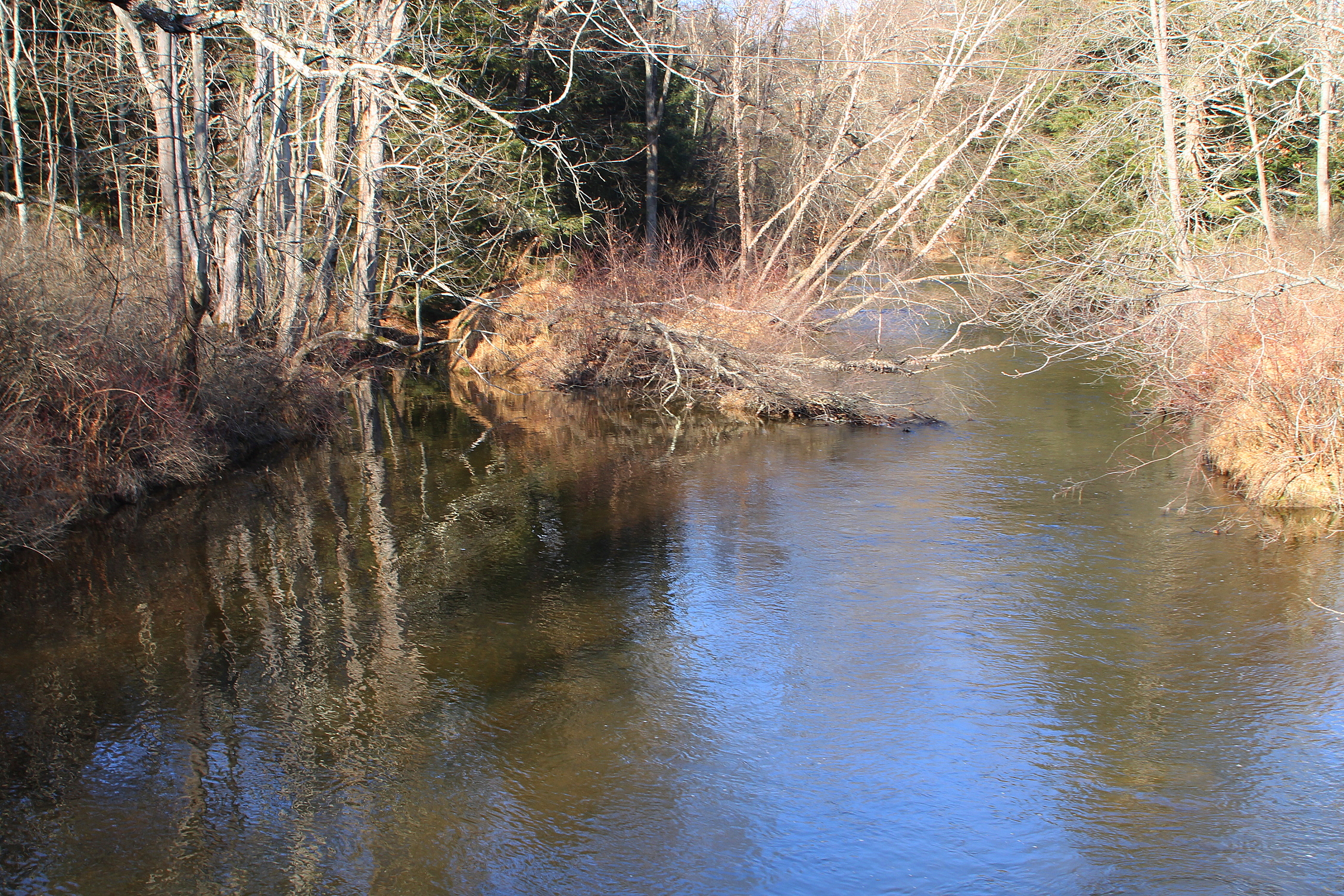
Pine Creek looking upstream in its lower reaches

Pine Creek begins in western Fairmount Township, Luzerne County, near the border between Luzerne County and Columbia County. It flows southeast for a few miles, entering a valley and receiving the tributaries Brish Run and Wasp Branch. The creek then turns south, passing near Red Hill. Further downstream, it enters Huntington Township. Shortly after entering this township, the creek picks up Bell Creek and continues south, crossing Pennsylvania Route 239 and entering the borough of New Columbus. On the southern side of New Columbus, the creek leaves Luzerne County and enters Columbia County.

Upon entering Columbia County, Pine Creek begins flowing through Fishing Creek Township. It makes several meanders before making a final turn south and reaching its confluence with Huntington Creek in the community of Jonestown.

Pine Creek joins Huntington Creek 4.26 miles (6.86 km) of its mouth.

=== Tributaries ===
Tributaries of Pine Creek include Brish Run, Wasp Branch, Bell Creek, Spring Branch, and Little Pine Creek. Little Pine Creek has a watershed area of 7.15 square miles and joins Pine Creek 2.02 miles (3.25 km) upstream of its mouth.

== Geography, geology, and climate ==
The watershed of Pine Creek has been described as "rough and hilly". Its valley is narrow and the hills around it are steep. The creek's channel is sinuous.

The channel of Pine Creek goes through sandstone.

9 miles (14 km) upstream of its mouth, the elevation of Pine Creek is 1,040 feet (320 m) above sea level. 8 miles (13 km) upstream of the mouth, the elevation is 900 feet (270 m) above sea level. At its mouth, the creek's elevation is 670 feet (200 m) above sea level.

On average, the annual level of precipitation in the vicinity of Pine Creek ranges from 35 to 50 inches (89 to 127 cm).

== Watershed ==
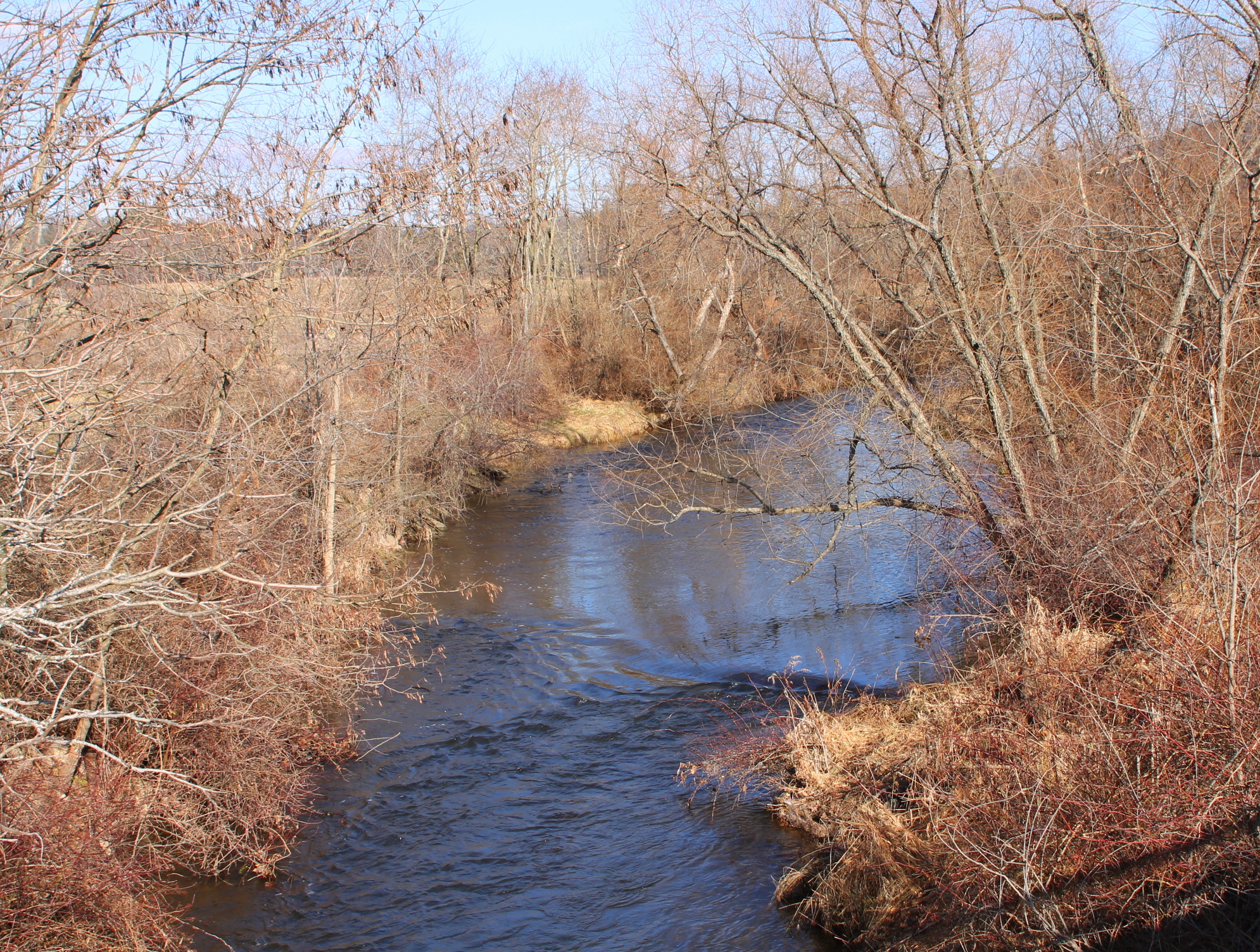
Pine Creek in New Columbus

The watershed of Pine Creek has an area of 30.7 square miles. It is located in northeastern Columbia County and northwestern Luzerne County. The uppermost reaches of the watershed are on North Mountain.

Communities in the watershed of Pine Creek include Cambria, New Columbus, and Fairmount Springs. In 1921, these communities had populations of 213, 175, and 100, respectively.

== History ==
Johnathan Westover, an early settler of Huntington Township, Luzerne County settled in the northwestern part of the township, near Pine Creek. Abram Dodder, a member of the second family to inhabit Fishing Creek Township, in Columbia County, settled on the creek in 1786. His father arrived there in 1788.

In 1814, Pine Creek was designated as a public highway between a sawmill belonging to Amos Buckalew in Columbia County and a location near Johnathan Westover's sawmill in Huntington Township, Luzerne County.

The August 19, 1890 Wilkes-Barre tornado, passed by the creek, where it had a smell resembling sulfur. The tornado was moving at approximately 60 miles (97 km) per hour at this point.

A woolen mill was built on Little Pine Creek, a tributary of Pine Creek, circa 1820. In the 1800s, D. Chatfield Brittain owned a 62-acre tract of forest on Pine Creek. In the early 1900s, industries in the vicinity of Pine Creek included agriculture and timber.

== Biology ==
The northern myotis bat was observed to be living on Pine Creek in 1999. The exact population of the bats here is not known.

Pine Creek is designated as a coldwater fishery and a migratory fishery.

The Western Pennsylvania Conservancy has recommended the creation of riparian buffers along several miles of Pine Creek and its tributaries.

== See also ==
- Kingsbury Brook, next tributary of Huntington Creek going upstream
- List of tributaries of Fishing Creek (North Branch Susquehanna River)
- List of rivers of Pennsylvania
