= Harveyville, Luzerne County, Pennsylvania =

Unincorporated community in Pennsylvania, US

Harveyville, Pennsylvania
- Location in Pennsylvania Location in the United States
- Coordinates: 41°12′50″N 76°14′46″W
- Country: United States
- State: Pennsylvania
- County: Luzerne
- Township: Huntington
- Elevation: 790 ft (240 m)
- Time zone: UTC-5 (Eastern (EST))
  - Summer (DST): UTC-4 (EDT)
- ZIP codes: 18655
- Area code: 570
- FIPS code: 42-33016
- GNIS feature ID: 1203757

Harveyville is a populated place situated in Huntington Township in Luzerne County, Pennsylvania, United States. It is one of two locales in Pennsylvania with the name Harveyville, the other being located in Chester County. It has an estimated elevation of 787 feet (240 m) above sea level.
