= Maple Run =

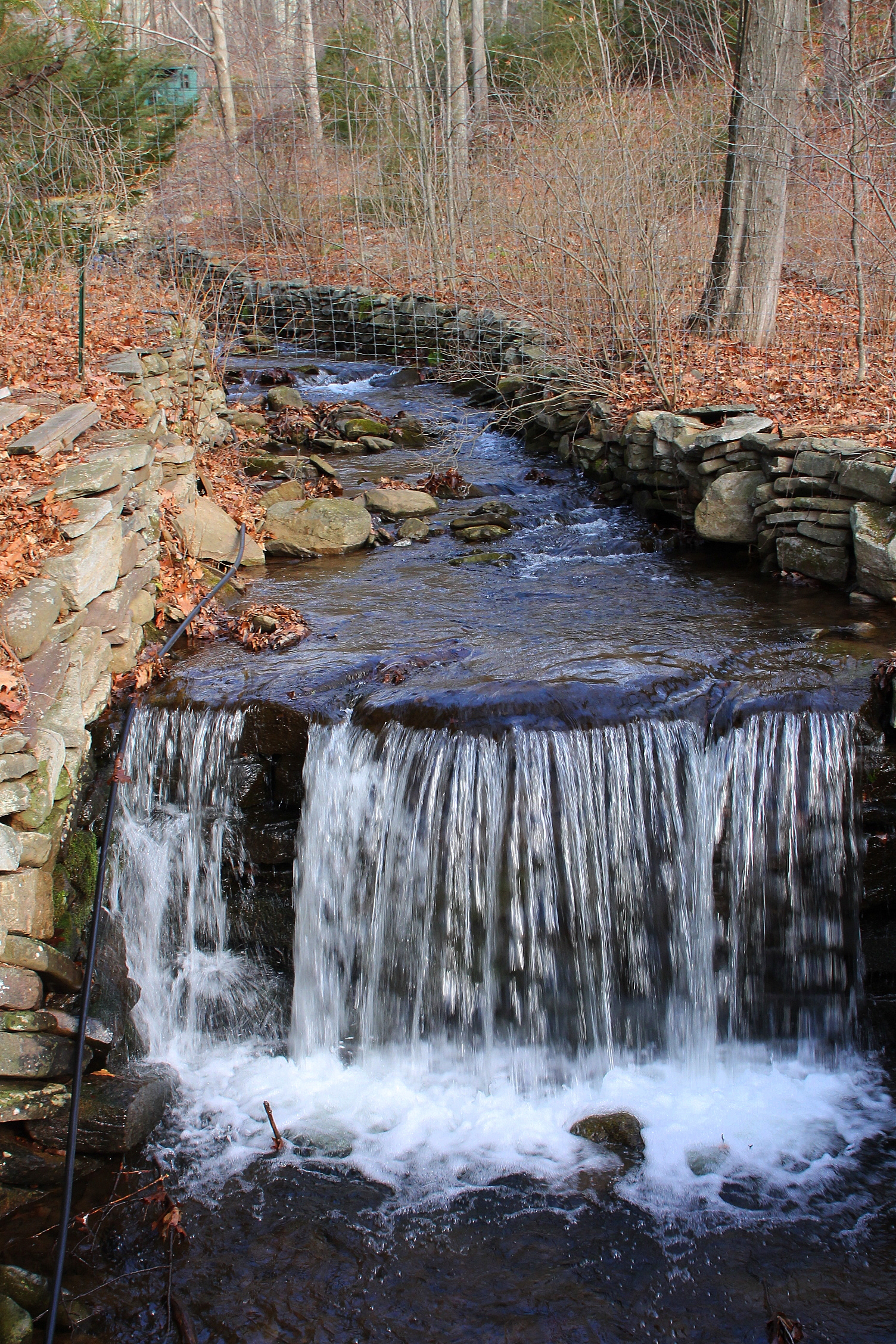
- Maple Run looking upstream

Physical characteristics
- Source
  - location: eastern side of Grand View in Fairmount Township, Luzerne County, Pennsylvania
  - elevation: between 2,200 and 2,220 feet (670 and 680 m)
- Mouth
  - location: Kitchen Creek in Fairmount Township, Luzerne County, Pennsylvania
  - coordinates: 41°15′58″N 76°15′35″W
  - elevation: 994 ft (303 m)
- Length: 5.2 mi (8.4 km)
- Basin size: 4.17 sq mi (10.8 km^{2})

Basin features
- Progression: Kitchen Creek → Huntington Creek → Fishing Creek → Susquehanna River → Chesapeake Bay
- Tributaries
  - left: three unnamed tributaries
  - right: one unnamed tributary

Maple Run is a tributary of Kitchen Creek in Luzerne County, Pennsylvania, in the United States. It is approximately 5.2 miles (8.4 km) long and flows through Fairmount Township. The watershed of the stream has an area of 4.17 square miles (10.8 km^{2}). There are several unnamed tributaries, but no named tributaries. Part of the stream is considered to be Class A Wild Trout Waters for brook trout, which inhabit the entire stream. Alluvium and glacial till can be found near it, as can bedrock made of sandstone and shale. There are at least two bridges crossing the stream and a sawmill was built on it in the early 1800s.

== Course ==
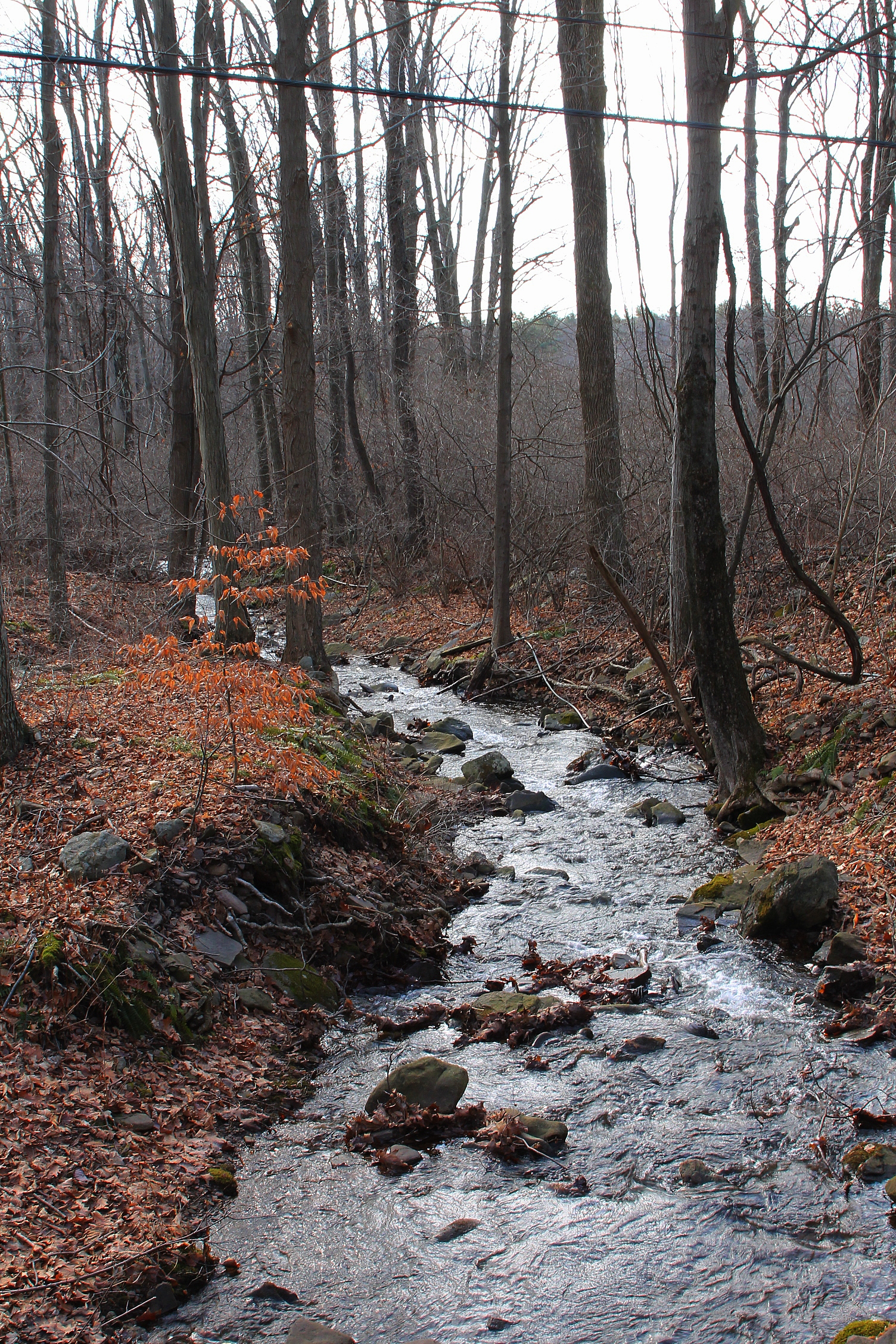
Maple Run looking downstream

Maple Run begins on the eastern side of a mountain known as Grand View in Fairmount Township. It flows southeast for a short distance, parallel to Pennsylvania Route 487. It then turns south and slightly east, entering a very deep and narrow valley. The stream continues to flow alongside Pennsylvania Route 487. After some distance, it gradually turns southwest, leaving the valley and receiving an unnamed tributary from the right. The stream then turns south-southeast and enters a much shallower and broader valley. It stops flowing alongside Pennsylvania Route 487 and instead flows alongside State Route 4013. After several tenths of a mile, it crosses Pennsylvania Route 118, passes through a wetland, and receives an unnamed tributary from the left. After more than a mile, it receives another unnamed tributary from the left and passes near the community of Mossville. The stream then turns nearly due south and its valley becomes considerably narrower and deeper again. After a few tenths of a mile, it turns east-southeast and flows in that direction for several tenths of a mile. It then receives one more unnamed tributary from the left and reaches its confluence with Kitchen Creek.

Maple Run joins Kitchen Creek 3.08 miles (4.96 km) upstream of its mouth.

== Hydrology, geography, and geology ==
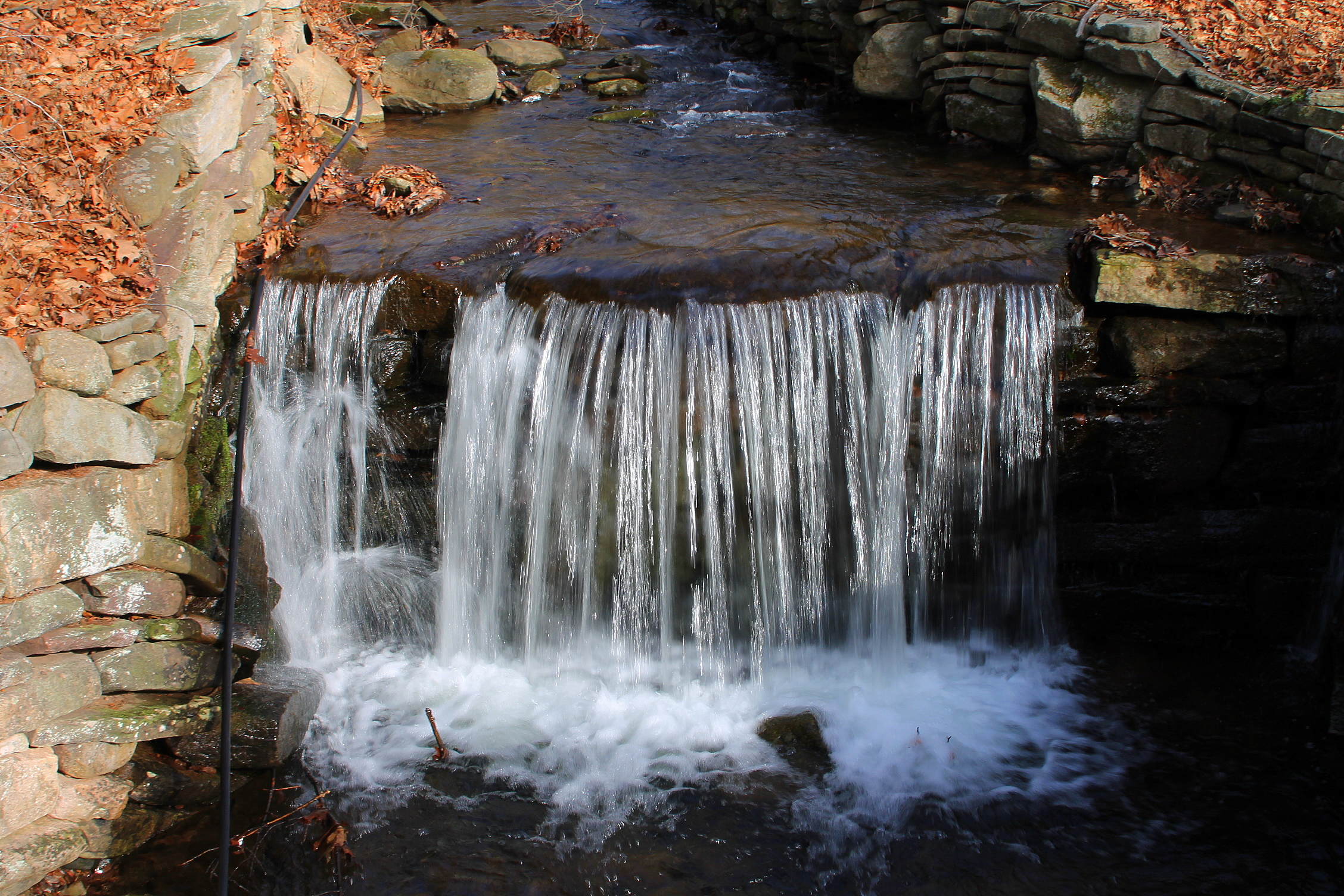
A small waterfall on Maple Run

The concentration of alkalinity in the waters of Maple Run is 5 milligrams per liter.

The elevation near the mouth of Maple Run is 994 feet (303 m) above sea level. The elevation of the stream's source is between 2,200 and 2,220 feet (670 and 680 m) above sea level.

For a significant portion of its length, Maple Run flows over alluvium, mostly in its middle reaches. The alluvium is 6 feet (1.8 m) thick and contains some boulders, especially closer to its headwaters. Under it lie unconsolidated glacial deposits. Wisconsinan Ice-Contact Stratified Drift occurs in the stream's lower reaches and in a small patch in its middle reaches. Wisconsinan Till, a glacial till, surrounds the stream, which flows through the till in its upper reaches. Near its headwaters, the stream is on bedrock made of sandstone and shale. It flows through a small patch of wetland in its middle reaches, just south of Pennsylvania Route 118.

A pipeline crosses Maple Run 2.4 miles (3.9 km) downstream of its headwaters.

== Watershed ==
The watershed of Maple Run has an area of 4.17 square miles (10.8 km^{2}). The stream is entirely within the United States Geological Survey quadrangle of Red Rock.

There is a small pond on or near Maple Run approximately 1,000 feet (300 m) north of Mossville. The 1978 State Water Plan considered the pond for use as a multipurpose reservoir. The plan referred to the pond as "Small Potential Reservoir #36-10".

== History ==
Maple Run was entered into the Geographic Names Information System on August 2, 1979. Its identifier in the Geographic Names Information System is 1180363.

In 1820, Peter Boston, a hunter and sawmill operator, settled on Maple Run in the south-central part of Fairmount Township (although it was part of Huntington Township at the time). He was one of the earlier settlers in the township. Joseph Moss also settled in the valley of the stream south of Peter Boston in the early 1800s. Later in the 1800s, the Moss Methodist Church and the Moss Schoolhouse were established in the area.

The first roads in Fairmount Township ran west and northwest along Maple Run. In 1837, Shadrach Laycock and Peter Boston constructed the first sawmills in Fairmount Township. The sawmills were on Huntington Creek and Maple Run. A prestressed box beam bridge was constructed over Maple Run in 1977. It is 32.2 feet (9.8 m) long and carries T-677 and Tripp Road. A concrete culvert bridge was built over the stream in 2007. This bridge is 23.0 feet (7.0 m) long and carries State Route 4013.

== Biology ==
A section of Maple Run stretching from its headwaters to the location where the pipeline crosses it is considered by the Pennsylvania Fish and Boat Commission to be Class A Wild Trout Waters for brook trout. This stretch is 2.4 miles (3.9 km) long. However, trout reproduce naturally throughout the entire stream.

== See also ==
- List of tributaries of Fishing Creek (North Branch Susquehanna River)
