= Brish Run =

Physical characteristics
- Source
  - location: relatively shallow valley in Fairmount Township, Luzerne County, Pennsylvania
  - elevation: 1,235 ft (376 m)
- Mouth
  - location: Pine Creek in Fairmount Township, Luzerne County, Pennsylvania within 1 mile (1.6 km) of Fairmount Springs
  - coordinates: 41°15′13″N 76°17′37″W
  - elevation: 1,027 ft (313 m)
- Length: 1.5 mi (2.4 km)
- Basin size: 0.66 mi^{2} (1.7 km^{2})

Basin features
- Progression: Pine Creek → Huntington Creek → Fishing Creek → Susquehanna River → Chesapeake Bay
- Tributaries
  - left: one unnamed tributary

Brish Run is a tributary of Pine Creek in Luzerne County, Pennsylvania, United States. It is approximately 1.5 miles (2.4 km) long and flows through Fairmount Township. The watershed of the stream has an area of 0.66 square miles (1.7 km^{2}). The stream has one unnamed tributary. The surficial geology in the vicinity of Brish Run mostly consists of Wisconsinan Till, but there is alluvium near its mouth and also bedrock in the area. The stream is being considered for wild trout designation.

== Course ==
Brish Run begins in a relatively shallow valley in Fairmount Township. It flows south-southeast through the valley for a few tenths of a mile before gradually turning south. A short distance further downstream, it receives an extremely short unnamed tributary from the left and crosses Municipal Road. The stream continues flowing south through its valley for several tenths of a mile, passing through a small pond before turning south-southwest. A few tenths of a mile further downstream, it reaches its confluence with Pine Creek.

Brish Run joins Pine Creek 10.45 miles (16.82 km) upstream of its mouth.

=== Tributaries ===
Brish Run has no named tributaries. However, it does have one unnamed tributary. This tributary begins in a pond and is slightly less than 0.1 miles (0.16 km) long.

== Geography and geology ==
The elevation near the mouth of Brish Run is 1,027 feet (313 m) above sea level. The elevation of the stream's source is 1,235 feet (376 m) above sea level.

The surficial geology in the vicinity of the mouth of Brish Run consists of alluvium. The rest of the stream flows through land with surficial geology consisting of a till known as Wisconsinan Till. Much of the stream's valley also has this in its surficial geology. However, there are patches of bedrock consisting of sandstone and shale.

== Watershed and biology ==
The watershed of Brish Run has an area of 0.66 square miles (1.7 km^{2}). The stream is entirely within the United States Geological Survey quadrangle of Red Rock. Its mouth is located within 1 mile (1.6 km) of Fairmount Springs.

Brish Run is the upstream-most tributary to join Pine Creek.

Brish Run is being considered by the Pennsylvania Fish and Boat Commission for wild trout designation.

== History ==
Brish Run was entered into the Geographic Names Information System on August 2, 1979. Its identifier in the Geographic Names Information System is 1170272.

Brish Run was surveyed by the Pennsylvania Fish and Boat Commission on July 9, 2014. It was listed as being considered for wild trout designation on April 9, 2015.

== See also ==
- Wasp Branch, next tributary of Pine Creek going downstream
- List of tributaries of Fishing Creek (North Branch Susquehanna River)
- List of rivers of Pennsylvania
