= Bittenbender Covered Bridge =

- U.S. National Register of Historic Places
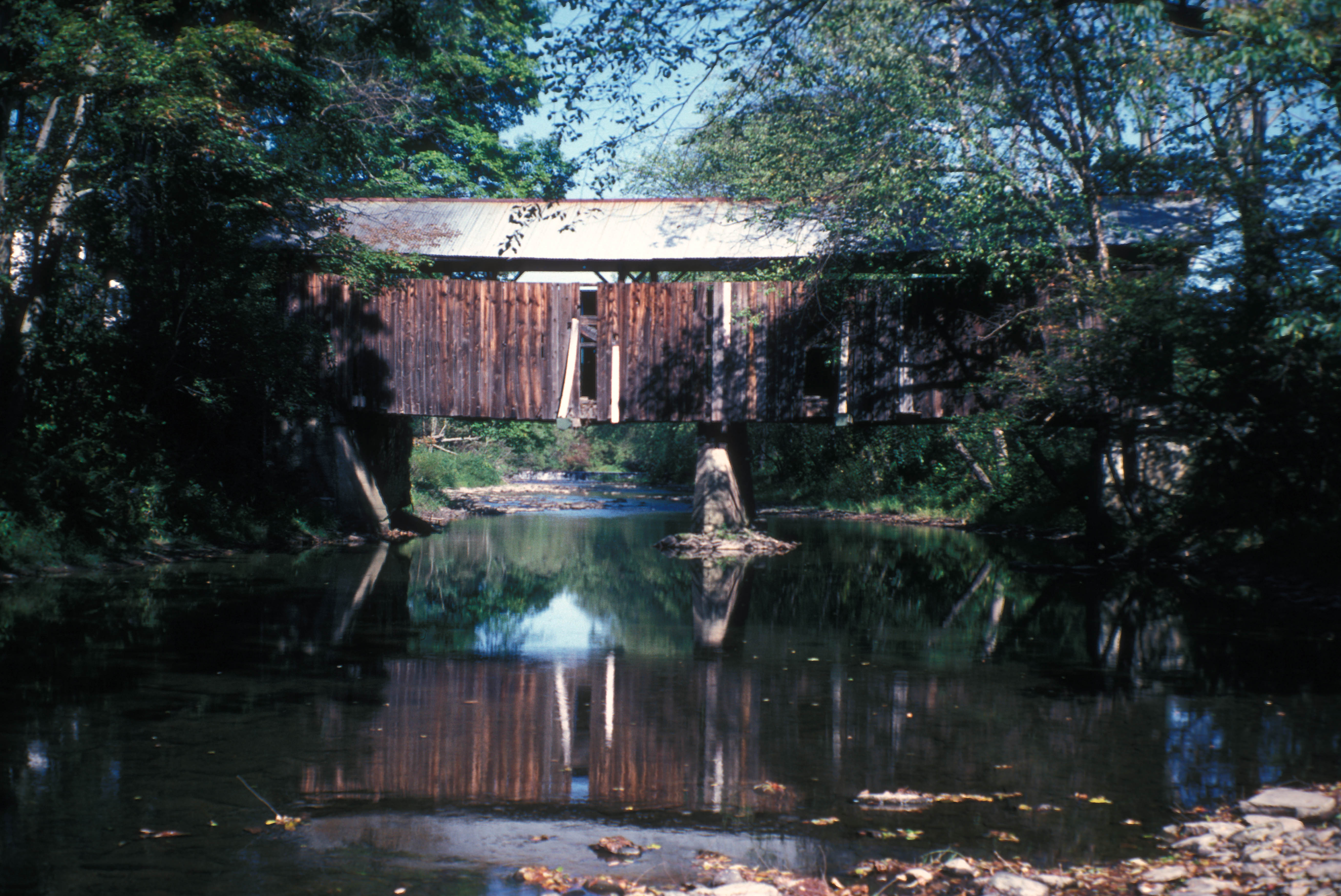
- The bridge in 1982

- Location within Pennsylvania Location within the United States
- Location: South of Huntington Mills off Legislative Route 40076, Huntington Township, Pennsylvania
- Coordinates: 41°10′51″N 76°13′30″W
- Area: 0.1 acres (0.040 ha)
- Built: 1888
- Architectural style: Queenpost truss
- MPS: Covered Bridges of the Delaware River Watershed TR
- NRHP reference No.: 80003563
- Added to NRHP: December 1, 1980

Bittenbender Covered Bridge was a historic wooden covered bridge in Huntington Township, Luzerne County, Pennsylvania. It was a 68.6-foot-long (20.9 m), Queenpost Truss bridge, constructed in 1888. It had rough vertical plank siding, crossed Huntington Creek, and was the last covered bridge in Luzerne County.

It was listed on the National Register of Historic Places in 1980. The bridge was destroyed in a flood on June 28, 2006.
