= Wasp Branch =

Physical characteristics
- Source
  - location: near the village of Mossville in Fairmount Township, Luzerne County, Pennsylvania
  - elevation: between 1,220 and 1,240 feet (370 and 380 m)
- Mouth
  - location: Pine Creek in Fairmount Township, Luzerne County, Pennsylvania
  - coordinates: 41°14′51″N 76°17′05″W
  - elevation: 974 ft (297 m)
- Length: 1.7 mi (2.7 km)
- Basin size: 0.90 sq mi (2.3 km^{2})

Basin features
- Progression: Pine Creek → Huntington Creek → Fishing Creek → Susquehanna River → Chesapeake Bay

Wasp Branch is a tributary of Pine Creek in Luzerne County, Pennsylvania, in the United States. It is approximately 1.7 miles (2.7 km) long and flows through Fairmount Township. The watershed of the stream has an area of 0.90 square miles (2.3 km^{2}). The stream is considered to be Class A Wild Trout Waters, a Coldwater Fishery, and a Migratory Fishery. Glacial till and bedrock consisting of stone and shale can be found in the stream's vicinity.

== Course ==
Wasp Branch begins near the village of Mossville in Fairmount Township. It flows south-southeast and enters a valley within a few tenths of a mile. The stream then turns south, its valley gradually becoming deeper. After more than a mile, it reaches its confluence with Pine Creek.

Wasp Branch joins Pine Creek 9.74 miles (15.68 km) upstream of its mouth.

== Hydrology, geography and geology ==
The concentration of alkalinity in the headwaters of Wasp Branch is 12 milligrams per liter.

The elevation near the mouth of Wasp Branch is 974 feet (297 m) above sea level. The elevation of the stream's source is between 1,220 and 1,240 feet (370 and 380 m) above sea level. The stream is in the Susquehanna Lowlands section of the ridge and valley physiographical province.

For a significant portion of its length, Wasp Branch is on a glacial till known as Wisconsinan Till. However, Wisconsinan Ice-Contact Stratified Drift and alluvium are also found along portions of the stream. There is also bedrock made of sandstone and shale in its vicinity.

== Watershed and history ==
The watershed of Wasp Branch has an area of 0.90 square miles (2.3 km^{2}). The stream is in the United States Geological Survey quadrangle of Red Rock and Stillwater. Its source is in the former quadrangle and its mouth is in the latter one. The drainage basin is part of the Upper Central Susquehanna River Subbasin. The stream itself is near the community of Fairmount Springs.

Wasp Branch was entered into the Geographic Names Information System on August 2, 1979. Its identifier in the Geographic Names Information System is 1193614.

== Biology ==
Wasp Branch is considered by the Pennsylvania Fish and Boat Commission to be Class A Wild Trout Waters for brook trout. It holds this designation from its headwaters to its mouth. The entire drainage basin of the stream is designated as a Coldwater Fishery and a Migratory Fishery. It is used as a High-Quality Coldwater Fishery and a Migratory Fishery.

A 1973 survey discovered no members of the Pteronarcyidae species Pteronarcys biloba on Wasp Branch.

== See also ==
- Little Pine Creek (Luzerne and Columbia Counties, Pennsylvania), another tributary of Pine Creek
- Brish Run, next tributary of Pine Creek going upstream
- List of tributaries of Fishing Creek (North Branch Susquehanna River)
