= Bridge in Fishing Creek Township =

- U.S. National Register of Historic Places
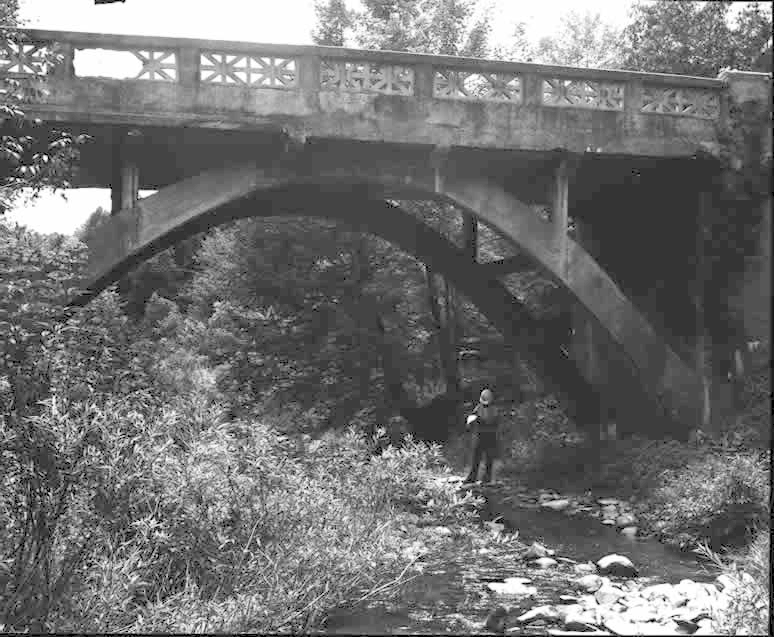
- Bridge in Fishing Creek Township, 1982

- Location within Pennsylvania Location within the United States
- Location: Legislative Route 19078 over Little Pine Creek, east of Bendertown, Fishing Creek Township, Pennsylvania
- Coordinates: 41°9′5″N 76°17′45″W
- Area: less than one acre
- Built: 1915
- Built by: John L. Elder
- Architect: G.A. Flink
- Architectural style: Open-spandrel arch
- MPS: Highway Bridges Owned by the Commonwealth of Pennsylvania, Department of Transportation TR
- NRHP reference No.: 88000738
- Added to NRHP: June 22, 1988

Bridge in Fishing Creek Township was a historic concrete arch bridge located in Fishing Creek Township in Columbia County, Pennsylvania. It was a 40-foot-long (12 m) open spandrel, single-span arch bridge constructed in 1915. The bridge featured a pierced molded concrete parapet with light, star-shaped designs. It crossed Little Pine Creek, but has been demolished.

The bridge was listed on the National Register of Historic Places in 1988.
