= Shingle Cabin Brook =

Shingle Cabin Brook Shingle Cabin Branch
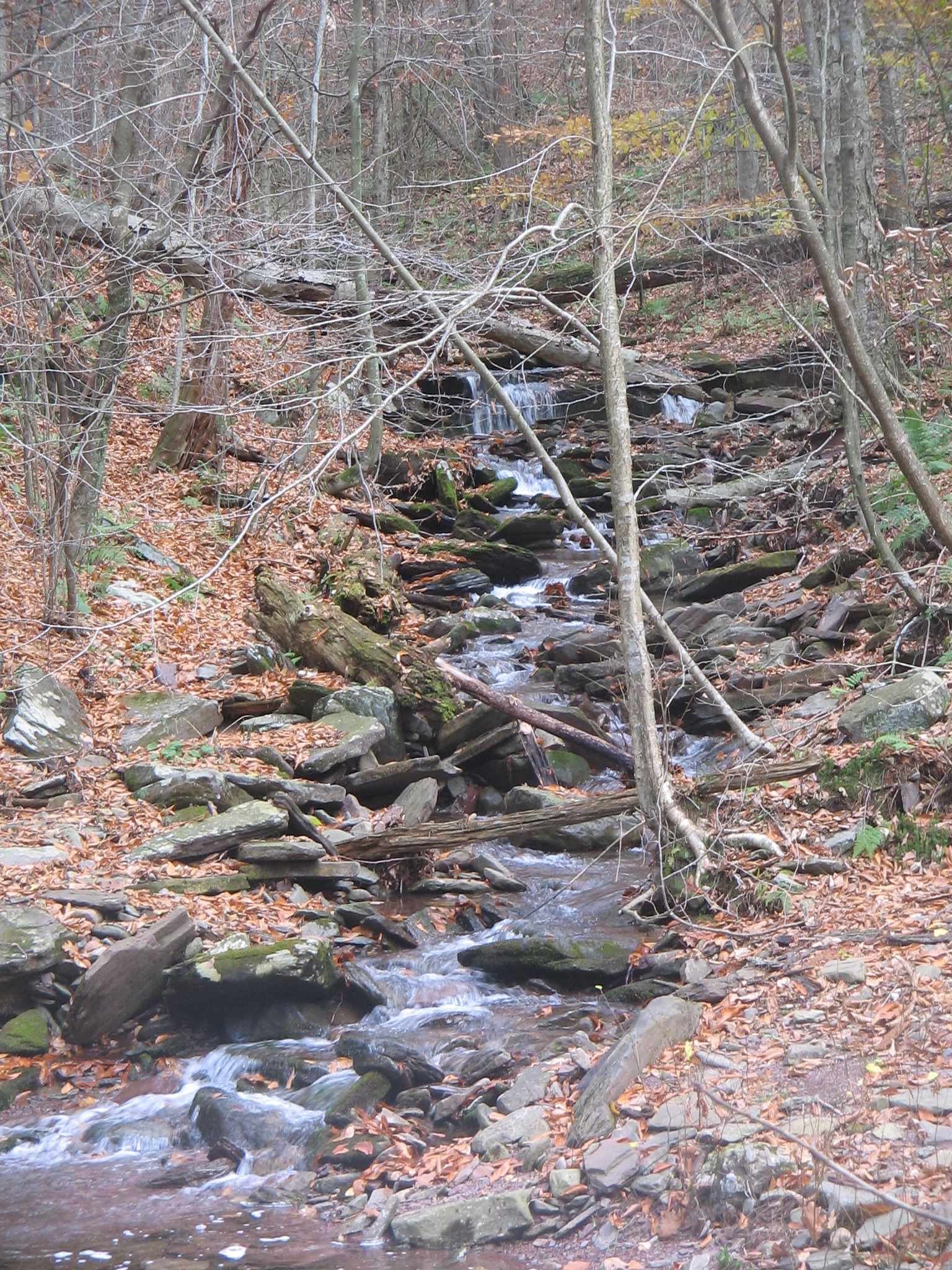
- Shingle Cabin Falls on Shingle Cabin Brook

Physical characteristics
- Source
  - location: valley in Fairmount Township, Luzerne County, Pennsylvania
  - elevation: just under 2,120 feet (650 m)
- Mouth
  - location: Kitchen Creek in Fairmount Township, Luzerne County, Pennsylvania
  - coordinates: 41°18′57″N 76°16′22″W
  - elevation: 1,378 ft (420 m)
- Length: 0.9 mi (1.4 km)
- Basin size: 0.47 mi^{2} (1.2 km^{2})

Basin features
- Progression: Kitchen Creek → Huntington Creek → Fishing Creek → Susquehanna River → Chesapeake Bay

Shingle Cabin Brook (also known as Shingle Cabin Branch) is a tributary of Kitchen Creek in Luzerne County, Pennsylvania, in the United States. It is approximately 0.9 miles (1.4 km) long and flows through Fairmount Township. The watershed of the stream has an area of 0.47 square miles (1.2 km^{2}). It is in Ricketts Glen State Park. The stream has one waterfall, which is known as Shingle Cabin Falls. The surficial geology in the area features Wisconsinan Till, Wisconsinan Bouldery Till, and bedrock consisting of sandstone and shale.

== Course ==
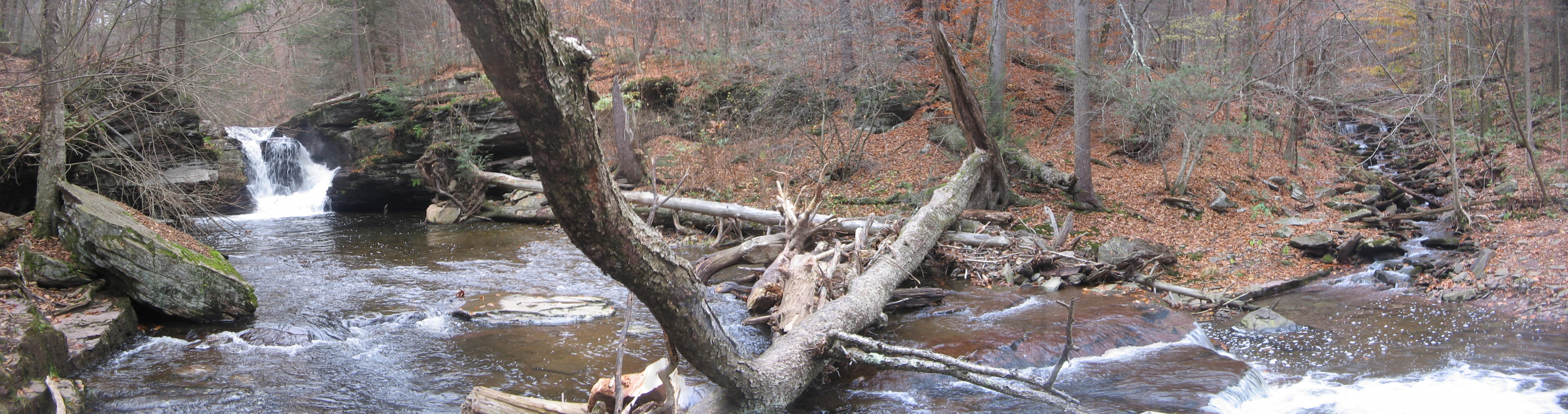
Confluence of Shingle Cabin Brook (right) with Kitchen Creek

Shingle Cabin Brook begins in a valley in Fairmount Township. It flows southwest for several hundred feet before turning west-northwest and then southwest. Its valley abruptly becomes much deeper. The stream turns west-southwest for a few tenths of a mile before turning west-northwest for a similar distance. It then turns southwest and reaches its confluence with Kitchen Creek.

Shingle Cabin Brook joins Kitchen Creek 6.86 miles (11.04 km) upstream of its mouth.

== Geography and geology ==
The elevation near the mouth of Shingle Cabin Brook is 1,378 feet (420 m) above sea level. The elevation of the stream's source is just under 2,120 feet (650 m) above sea level.

Shingle Cabin Brook is a small stream. It is not perennial, but instead only flows seasonally after substantial rains.

The surficial geology in the vicinity of Shingle Cabin Brook mainly consists of a glacial or resedimented till known as Wisconsinan Till. However, bedrock consisting of sandstone and shale is also present on the sides of its valley. Wisconsinan Bouldery Till is also present at the stream's headwaters.

== Watershed ==
The watershed of Shingle Cabin Brook has an area of 0.47 square miles (1.2 km^{2}). The stream is entirely within the United States Geological Survey quadrangle of Red Rock.

A waterfall known as Shingle Cabin Falls is on Shingle Cabin Brook at the stream's confluence with Kitchen Creek. The falls are a cascade with a height of 25 feet (7.6 m). The stream is not far from Waters Meet on Kitchen Creek.

== History ==
Shingle Cabin Brook was entered into the Geographic Names Information System on August 2, 1979. Its identifier in the Geographic Names Information System is 1187530.

== Recreation ==
Shingle Cabin Brook is entirely within Ricketts Glen State Park. The stream is also in the vicinity of The Glens Natural Area within Ricketts Glen State Park. Hunting is forbidden in the vicinity of the stream, except at its headwaters.

A hiking trail passes near Shingle Cabin Brook, but on the other side of Kitchen Creek. The stream can be partially seen from this trail. Additionally, the Old Bulldozer Road Trail passes by the headwaters of Shingle Cabin Brook.

== See also ==
- Maple Spring Brook, next tributary of Kitchen Creek going downstream
- List of rivers of Pennsylvania
