= Boston Run =

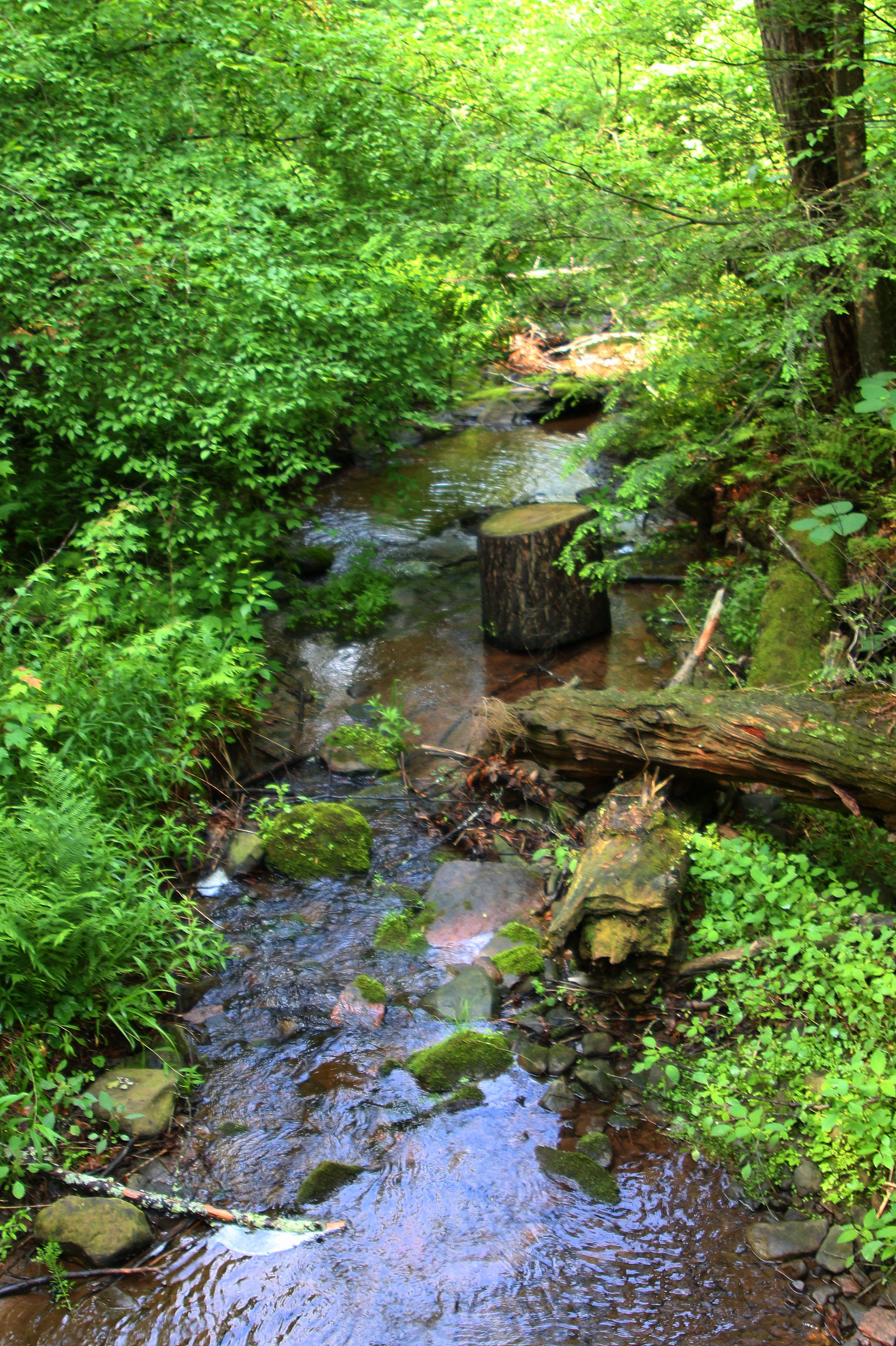
- Boston Run looking downstream in Ricketts Glen State Park

Physical characteristics
- Source
  - location: southern base of a mountain in Fairmount Township, Luzerne County, Pennsylvania
  - elevation: between 1,480 and 1,500 feet (450 and 460 m)
- Mouth
  - location: Kitchen Creek in Kitchen Creek Gorge in Fairmount Township, Luzerne County, Pennsylvania
  - coordinates: 41°17′50″N 76°16′24″W
  - elevation: 1,197 ft (365 m)
- Length: 1.2 mi (1.9 km)
- Basin size: 0.66 mi^{2} (1.7 km^{2})

Basin features
- Progression: Kitchen Creek → Huntington Creek → Fishing Creek → Susquehanna River → Chesapeake Bay

Boston Run is a tributary of Kitchen Creek in Luzerne County, Pennsylvania, in the United States. It is approximately 1.2 miles (1.9 km) long and flows through Fairmount Township. The watershed of the creek has an area of 0.66 square miles (1.7 km^{2}). Old-growth forests are in the vicinity and wild trout naturally reproduce in the stream. The surficial geology nearby features Wisconsinan Outwash, Wisconsinan Till, fill, and bedrock consisting of sandstone and shale.

== Course ==
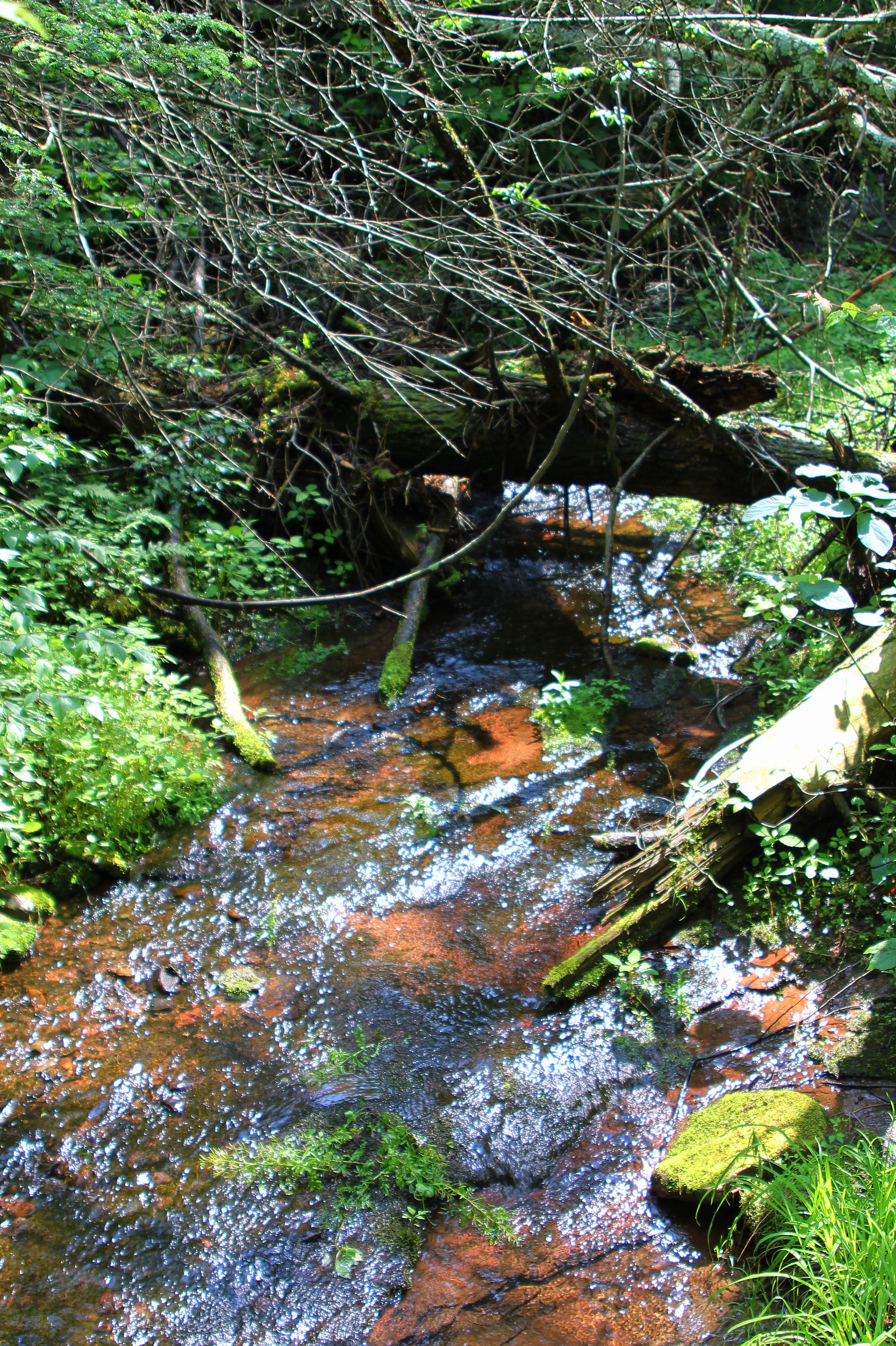
Boston Run looking upstream from the Evergreen Trail in Ricketts Glen State Park

Boston Run begins on the southern base of a mountain in Fairmount Township. It flows southwest for a short distance before turning west for a few tenths of a mile. The stream then turns southwest, passing through a small pond and crossing Pennsylvania Route 118. It then turns west-southwest for several tenths of a mile before reaching its confluence with Kitchen Creek in Kitchen Creek Gorge.

Boston Run joins Kitchen Creek 5.52 miles (8.88 km) upstream of its mouth.

== Geography and geology ==
The elevation near the mouth of Boston Run is 1,197 feet (365 m) above sea level. The elevation of the stream's source is between 1,480 and 1,500 feet (450 and 460 m) above sea level. Boston Run is a small stream.

The surficial geology in the vicinity of the lower reaches of Boston Run mainly consists of Wisconsinan Outwash, which contains stratified sand and gravel. Bedrock consisting of sandstone and shale is in the surficial geology at the mouth of the stream. In the upper reaches, there is mainly a glacial or resedimented till known as Wisconsinan Till. However, there is also a small patch of fill where the stream crosses Pennsylvania Route 118.

== Watershed ==
The watershed of Boston Run has an area of 0.66 square miles (1.7 km^{2}). The stream is entirely within the United States Geological Survey quadrangle of Red Rock.

Boston Run is crossed by at least one bridge, which is situated on a hiking trail.

== History and recreation ==
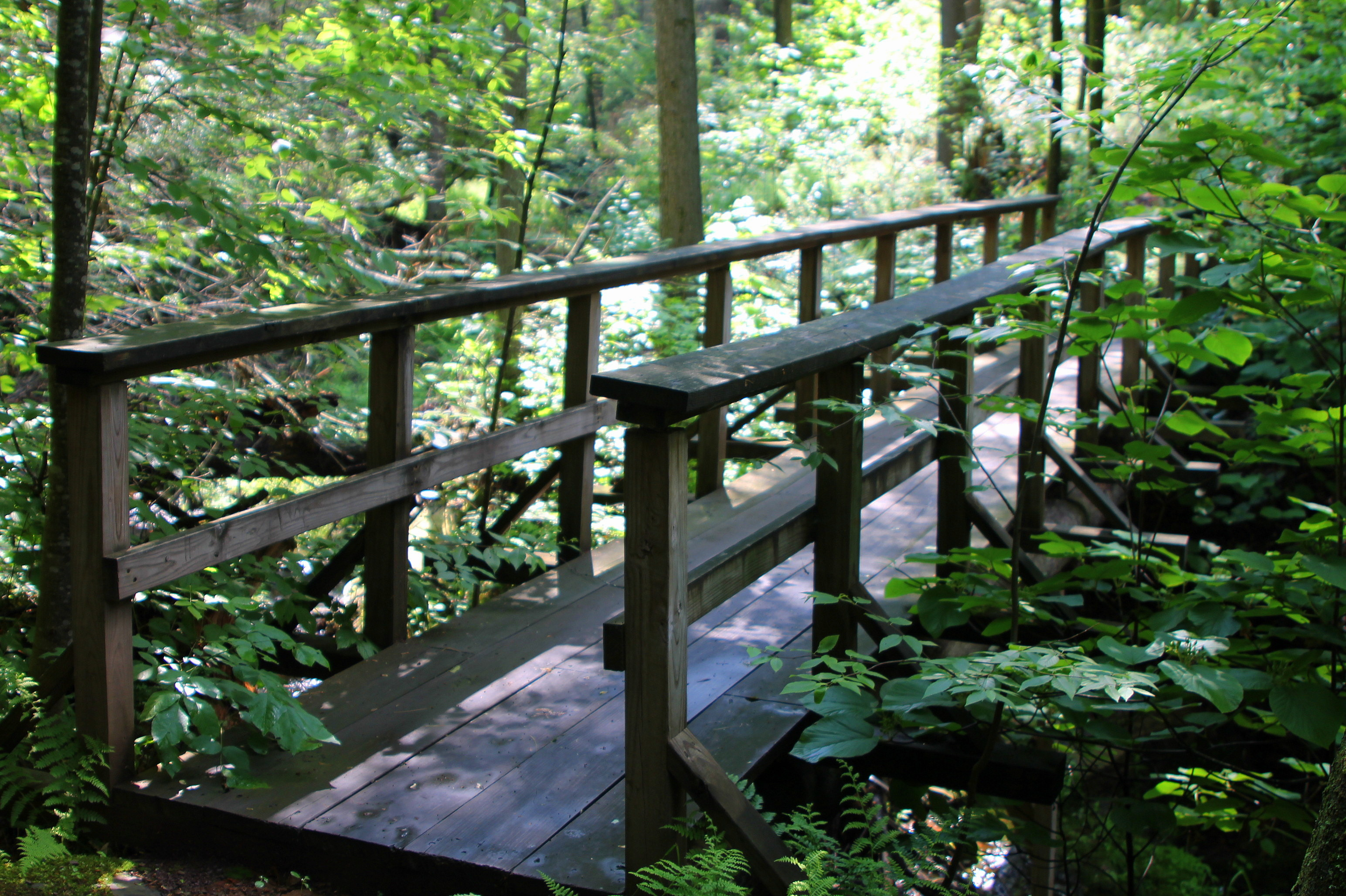
Wooden bridge carrying the Evergreen Trail over Boston Run at Ricketts Glen State Park

Boston Run was entered into the Geographic Names Information System on August 2, 1979. Its identifier in the Geographic Names Information System is 1170025.

An unblazed hiking trail known as the Evergreen Trail crosses Boston Run twice. The trail is 1 mile (1.6 km) long and has an elevation change of 50 feet (15 m). Jeff Mitchell's book Hiking the Endless Mountains: Exploring the Wilderness of Northeastern Pennsylvania considers it to be easy. The Boston Run Nature Area is located close to the stream.

== Biology ==
Wild trout naturally reproduce in Boston Run from its headwaters downstream to its mouth.

As of 2014, there is a large tulip poplar on Boston Run at one location. An old-growth forest is in the general vicinity of the stream.

== See also ==
- Crooked Creek (Kitchen Creek), next tributary of Kitchen Creek going downstream
- Maple Spring Brook, next tributary of Kitchen Creek going upstream
- List of rivers of Pennsylvania
