= New Columbus, Pennsylvania =

Borough in Pennsylvania, US

- Borough
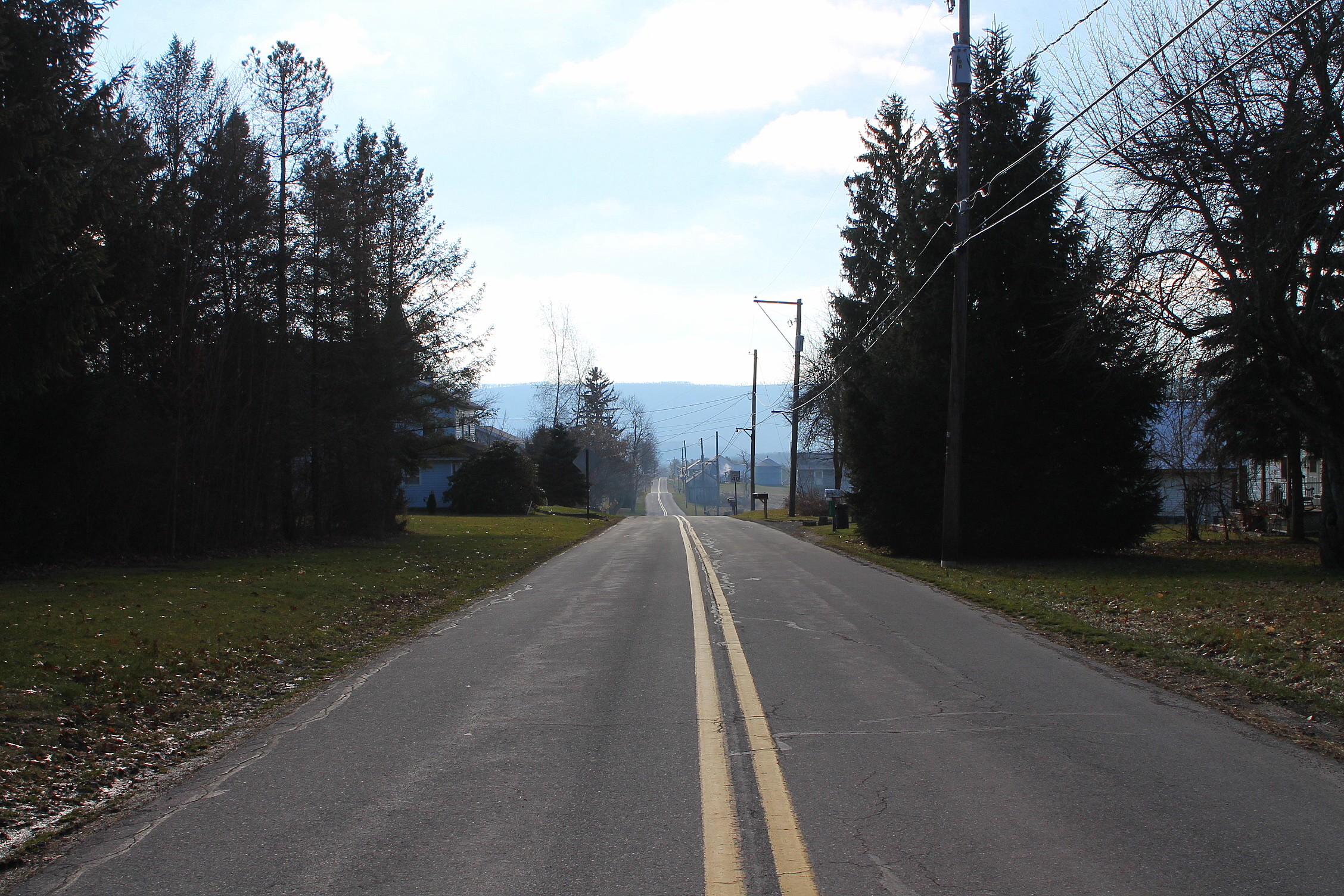
- Old Tioga Turnpike in New Columbus

- Location of New Columbus in Luzerne County, Pennsylvania.

- Location within Pennsylvania Location within the United States
- Coordinates: 41°10′21″N 76°17′22″W
- Country: United States
- State: Pennsylvania
- County: Luzerne
- Settled: 1819
- Incorporated: 1859

Government
  - Type: Borough Council

Area
  - Total: 3.10 sq mi (8.04 km^{2})
  - Land: 3.10 sq mi (8.04 km^{2})
  - Water: 0 sq mi (0.00 km^{2})

Population (2020)
  - Total: 222
  - Density: 71.5/sq mi (27.62/km^{2})
- Time zone: UTC-5 (Eastern (EST))
  - Summer (DST): UTC-4 (EDT)
- Area code: 570
- FIPS code: 42-53448

New Columbus is a borough that is located in Luzerne County, Pennsylvania, United States. The population was 219 at the time of the 2020 census.

== History ==
A small farming town that is located in western Luzerne County (just south of Ricketts Glen State Park), New Columbus was first settled in 1819. It was later incorporated as a borough in 1859.

The community has changed little since its founding; farming is still a major way of life for most of the borough.

== Geography ==
New Columbus is located at 41°10′21″N 76°17′22″W (41.1734, -76.2935).

There are small clusters of houses scattered throughout the borough; most of the community consists of farmland. Downtown New Columbus, which consists of a few homes and businesses, is located at the intersection of Old Tioga Turnpike and Academy Street. According to the United States Census Bureau, the borough has a total area of 3.1 square miles (7.9 km^{2}), all of it land.

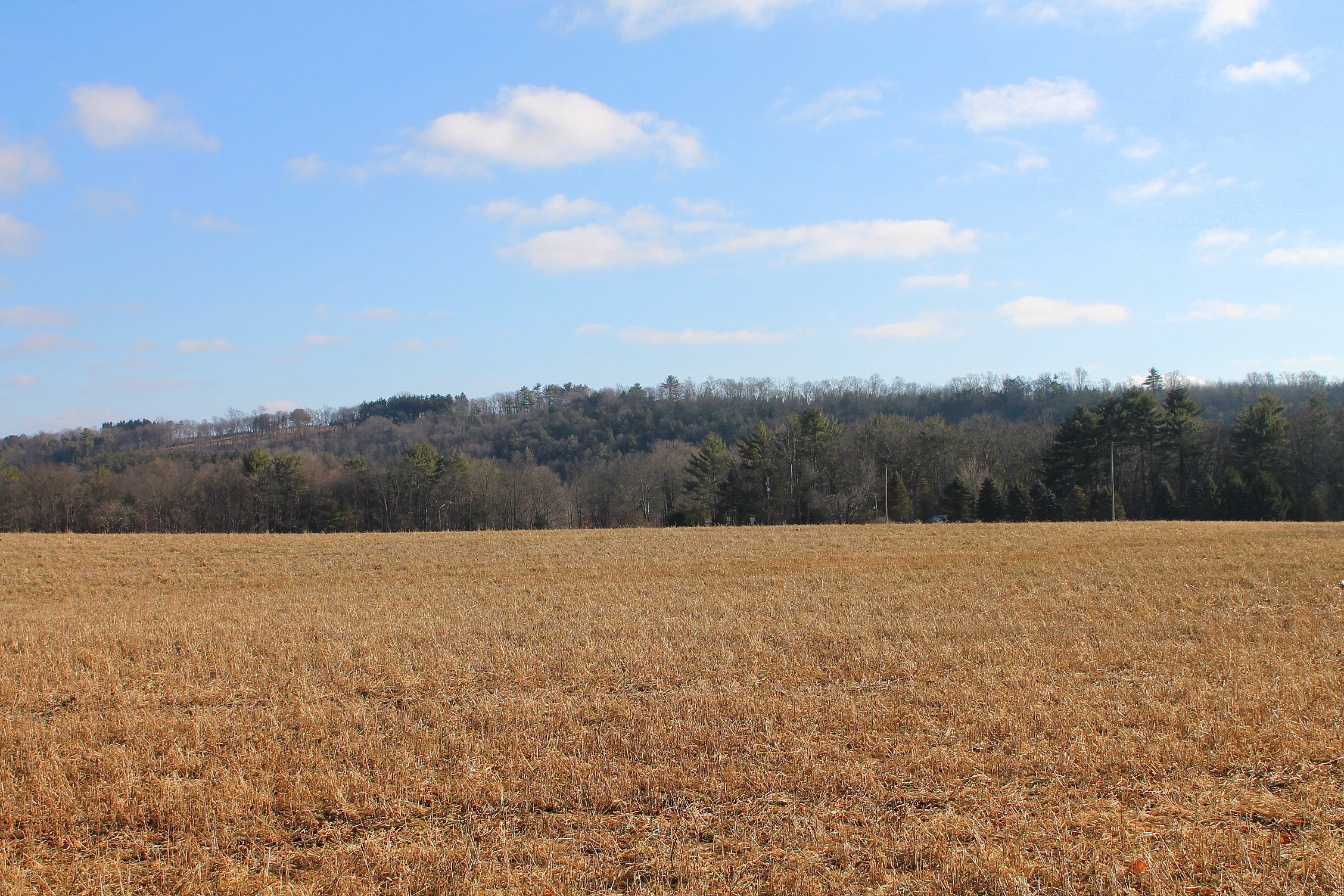
Farmland in New Columbus

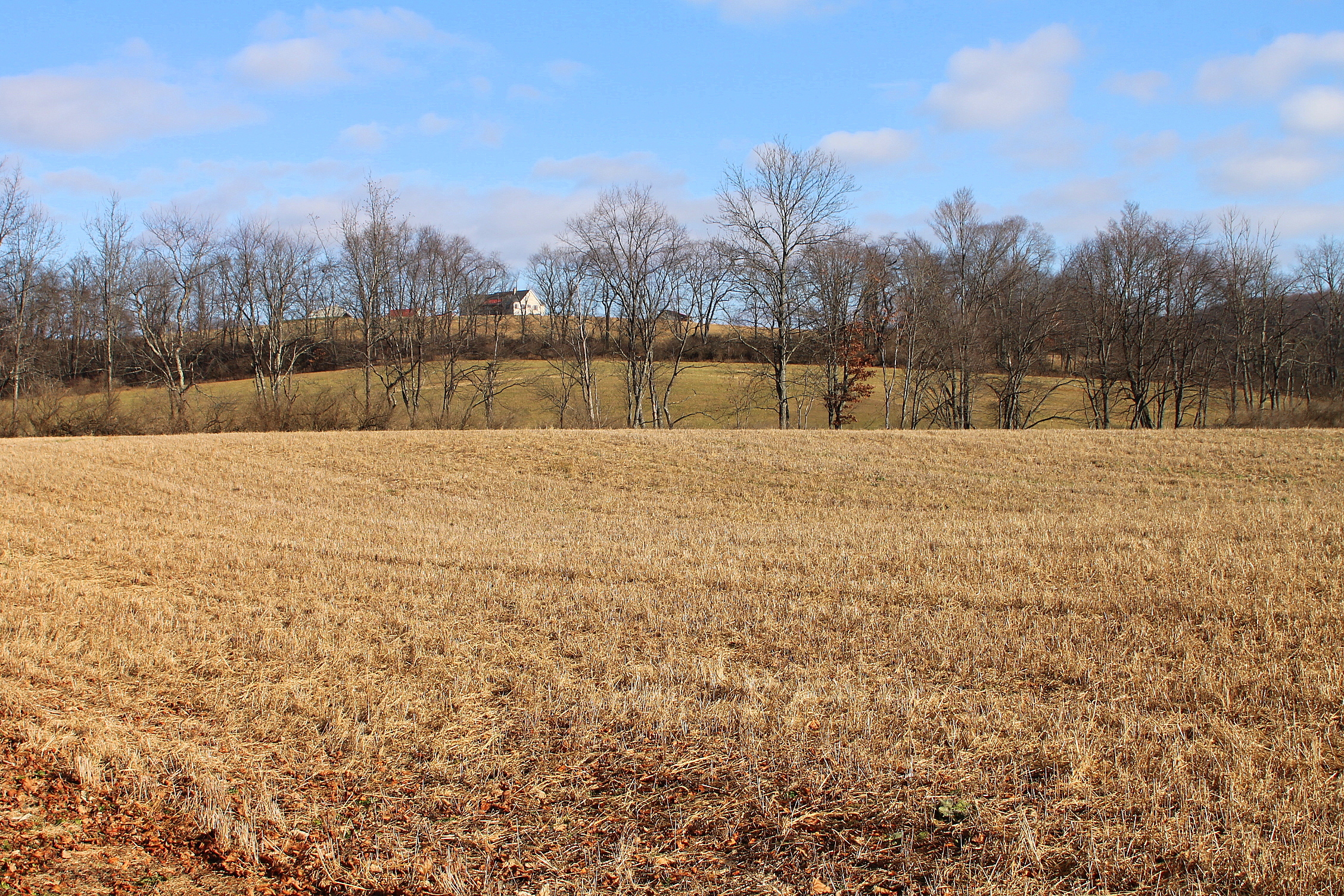
Farmland in New Columbus

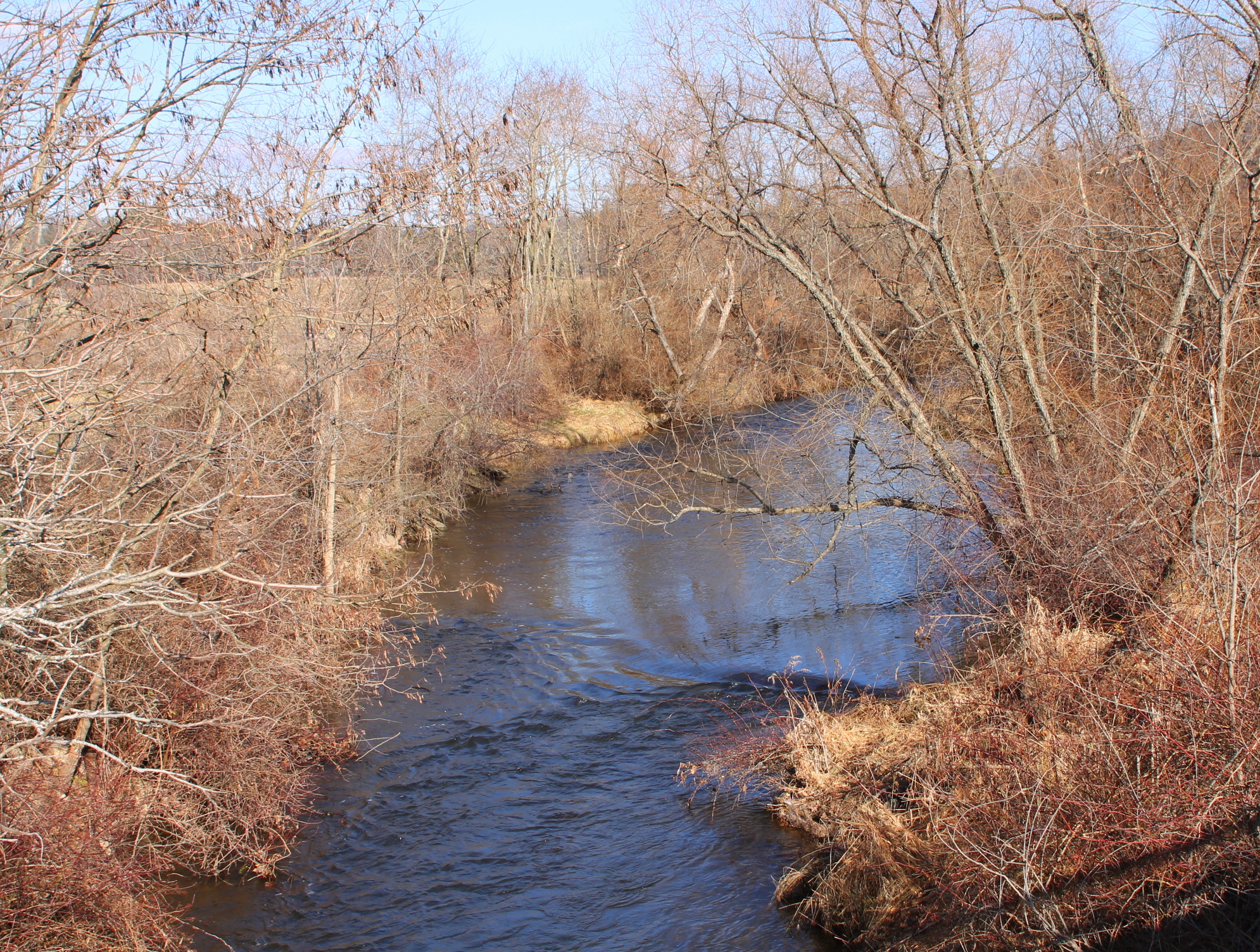
Pine Creek in New Columbus

== Demographics ==
Historical population
Census	Pop.	Note	%±
1860	240		—
1870	250		4.2%
1880	267		6.8%
1890	214		−19.9%
1900	202		−5.6%
1910	175		−13.4%
1920	136		−22.3%
1930	127		−6.6%
1940	182		43.3%
1950	152		−16.5%
1960	144		−5.3%
1970	149		3.5%
1980	214		43.6%
1990	228		6.5%
2000	215		−5.7%
2010	227		5.6%
2020	222		−2.2%
2021 (est.)	218	▼	−1.8%

As of the census of 2000, there were 215 people, 86 households, and 63 families residing in the borough. The population density was 68.1 inhabitants per square mile (26.3/km^{2}). There were 96 housing units at an average density of 30.4 per square mile (11.7/km^{2}).

The racial makeup of the borough was 100.00% white. Hispanic or Latino of any race were 1.40% of the population.

There were eighty-six households, out of which 31.4% had children under the age of eighteen living with them, with 60.5% living together as married couples, 9.3% documented as a female householder with no husband present, and 25.6% which were documented as non-families. Additionally, individuals 22.1% of all households were made up of individuals with 11.6% that had someone living alone who was sixty-five years of age or older.

The average household size was 2.5 and the average family size was 2.94.

Within the borough, the population was spread out, with 25.1% of residents who were under the age of eighteen, 5.1% who were aged eighteen to twenty-four, 31.2% who were aged twenty-five to forty-four, 18.6% who were aged forty-five to sixty-four, and 20.0% who were sixty-five years of age or older.

The median age of residents was thirty-six years. For every one hundred females there were eighty-seven males. For every one hundred females who were aged eighteen or older, there were roughly ninety-six males.

The median income for a household in the borough was $38,594, and the median income for a family was $39,844. Males had a median income of $31,250 compared with that of $21,071 for females. The per capita income for the borough was $15,981.

Only 2.7% of the population lived below the poverty line. None of those living in poverty were under the age of eighteen or living with families; however, 8.7% of those who were documented as impoverished were aged sixty-four or older.

As of 2017, the population of New Columbus was 222.

== Education ==
The school district is Northwest Area School District.

== Gallery ==
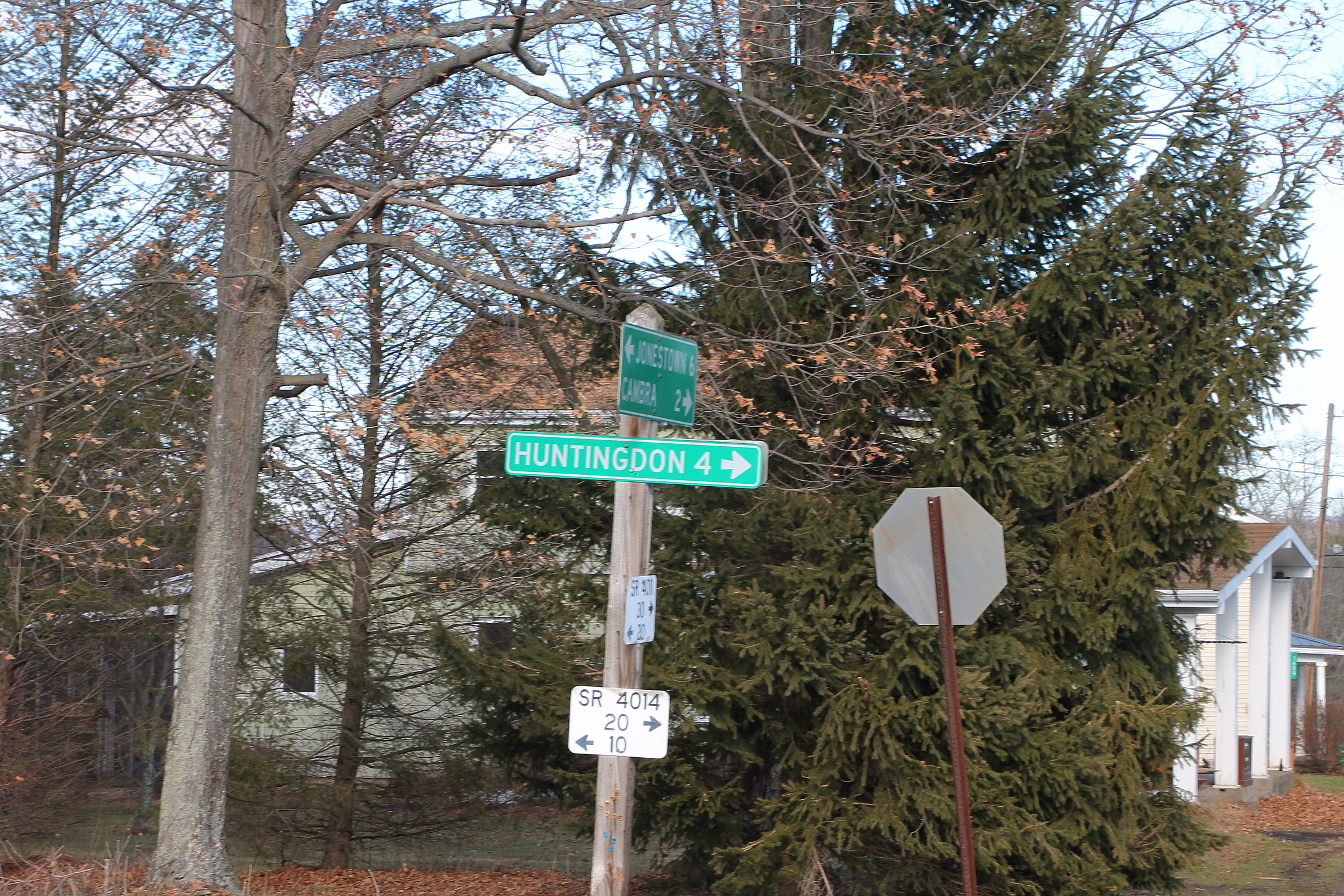
