= Huntington Township, Luzerne County, Pennsylvania =

Township in Pennsylvania, US

Coordinates: 41°12′00″N 76°15′59″W

- Township
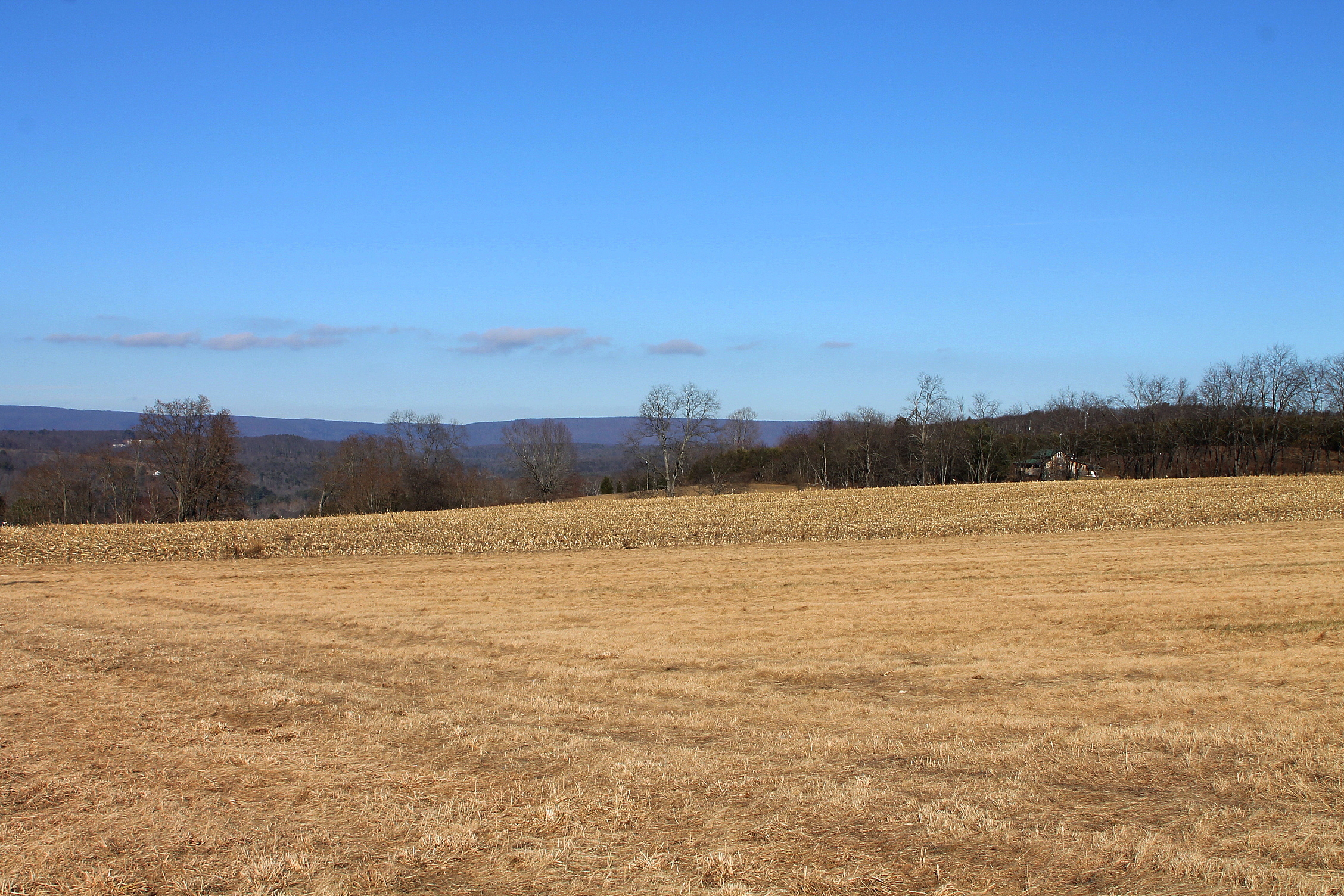
- Northeastern Huntington Township

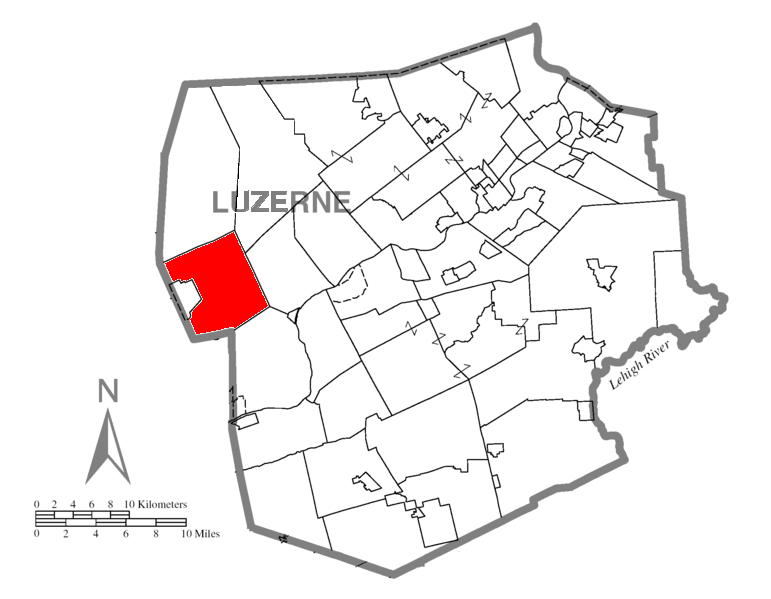
- Map of Luzerne County highlighting Huntington Township

- Map of Pennsylvania highlighting Luzerne County
- Country: United States
- State: Pennsylvania
- County: Luzerne

Area
  - Total: 28.72 sq mi (74.39 km^{2})
  - Land: 28.48 sq mi (73.75 km^{2})
  - Water: 0.24 sq mi (0.63 km^{2})

Population (2020)
  - Total: 2,052 ▼
  - Estimate (2021): 2,056
  - Density: 77.7/sq mi (29.99/km^{2})
- Time zone: UTC-5 (Eastern (EST))
  - Summer (DST): UTC-4 (EDT)
- FIPS code: 42-079-36432

Huntington Township is a township which is in Luzerne County, Pennsylvania, United States. The population was 2,052 at the time of the 2020 census.

== History ==
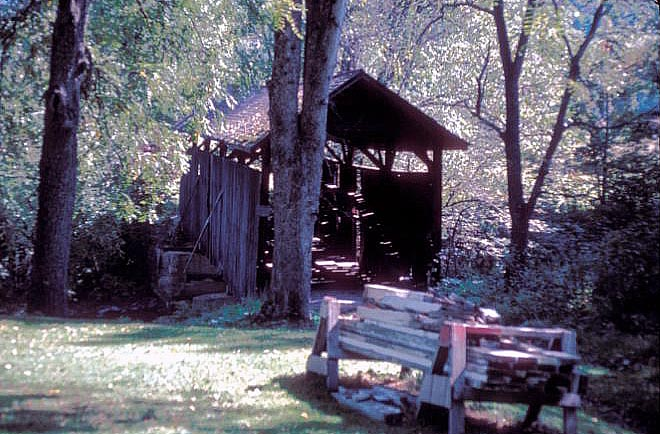
Bittenbender Covered Bridge

Huntington Township is located in western Luzerne County. This area is also known as the Wyoming Valley. In 1762, the Susquehanna Company attempted to settle the land. Company executives, who employed rough six hundred people from Windham County, Connecticut during this time, sent a number of their personnel to the modern-day counties of Luzerne, Lackawanna, Wyoming, Bradford, and Susquehanna to resettle there. Conflict with Native Americans in the region ensued, causing delays in those plans, which were also delayed further by the Revolutionary War (from 1775 to 1783).

The first settler, John Franklin, came from Connecticut as one of the Susquehanna landowners. He was soon followed by the families of Levi Seward, Nathaniel Goss, Abraham Hess, and Reuben Culver (all of whom were influential settlers in Huntington Township).

Finally, following the Revolutionary War, under the acts of the General Assembly of Pennsylvania passed in 1799, Huntington Township was created along with seventeen other certified townships in the counties of Luzerne, Lackawanna, Wyoming, Bradford, and Susquehanna.

Previous to the acts of the Assembly, Huntington Township was known as Bloomingdale Township and considered part of Connecticut. However, in 1799, once the township was inducted into Luzerne County, Bloomingdale Township was renamed Huntington Township after Samuel Huntington (one of the original signers of the Declaration of Independence).

=== Notable architectural features ===
The Bittenbender Covered Bridge was listed on the National Register of Historic Places in 1980.

== Geography ==
According to the United States Census Bureau, the township has a total area of 28.7 square miles (74.4 km^{2}), of which 28.5 square miles (73.8 km^{2}) is land and 0.23 square miles (0.6 km^{2}), or 0.85%, is water. Most of the township is made up of small farming communities (e.g., Cambra, Harveyville, Huntington Mills, and Waterton). It is bordered to the south by Huntington Mountain. Huntington Creek flows through the center of the municipality. The only major route in the township is PA 239.

Waterton, Pennsylvania is a hamlet in the township.

== Demographics ==
Historical population
Census	Pop.	Note	%±
2000	2,104		—
2010	2,244		6.7%
2020	2,052		−8.6%
2021 (est.)	2,056		0.2%
U.S. Decennial Census

As of the census of 2000, there were 2,104 people, 780 households, and 601 families living in the township.

The population density was 74.0 inhabitants per square mile (28.6/km^{2}). There were 893 housing units at an average density of 31.4 per square mile (12.1/km^{2}).

The racial makeup of the township was 98.29% White, 0.29% African American, 0.10% Native American, 0.19% Asian, 0.14% from other races, and 1.00% from two or more races. Hispanic or Latino of any race were 0.62% of the population.

There were 780 households, out of which 32.4% had children under the age of eighteen living with them; 65.4% were married couples living together, 7.9% had a female householder with no husband present, and 22.9% were non-families. 18.5% of all households were made up of individuals, and 8.3% had someone living alone who was sixty-five years of age or older.

The average household size was 2.61 and the average family size was 2.96.

In the township, the population was spread out, with 23.3% under the age of eighteen, 6.7% from eighteen to twenty-four, 28.9% from twenty-five to forty-four, 25.3% from forty-five to sixty-four, and 15.8% who were sixty-five years of age or older. The median age was thirty-nine years.

For every one hundred females, there were 98.3 males. For every one hundred females who were aged eighteen or older, there were 93.8 males.

The median income for a household in the township was $38,173, and the median income for a family was $41,940. Males had a median income of $32,097 compared with that of $20,750 for females.

The per capita income for the township was $17,461.

Roughly 7.5% of families and 9.1% of the population were living below the poverty line, including 9.1% of those who were under the age of eighteen and 7.8% of those who were aged sixty-five or older.

== Gallery ==
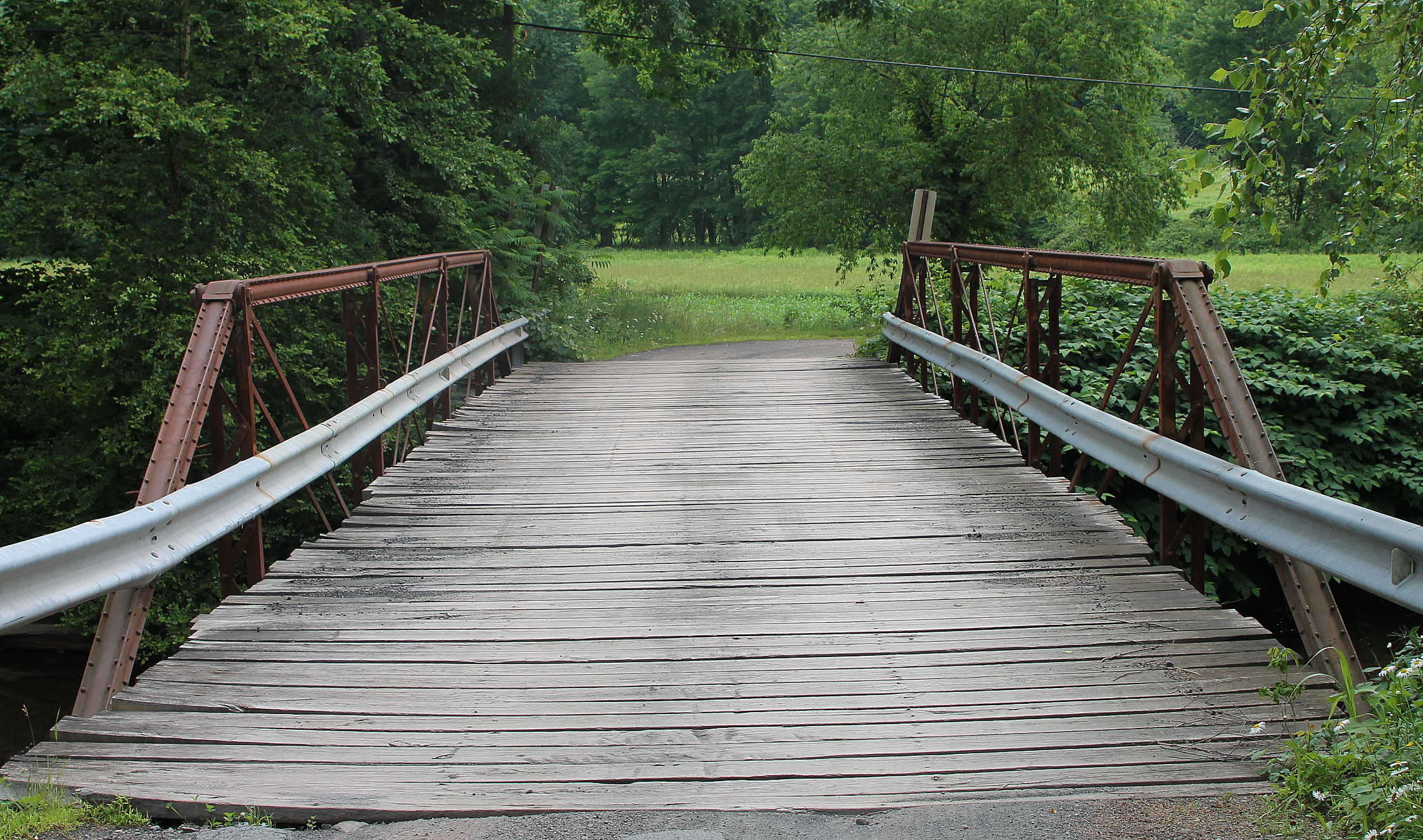
Bridge over Huntington Creek (in Huntington Township)

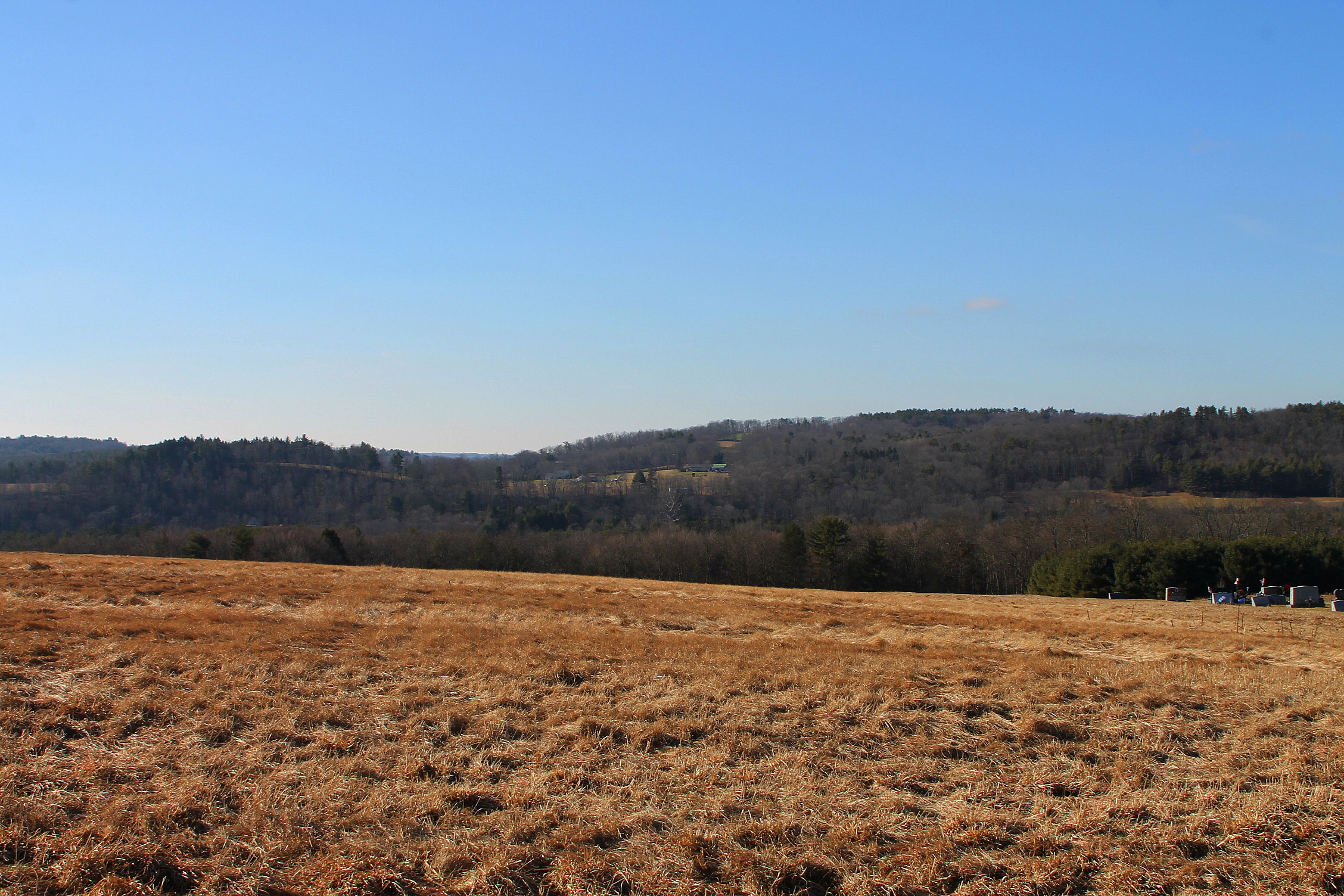
Northeastern Huntington Township

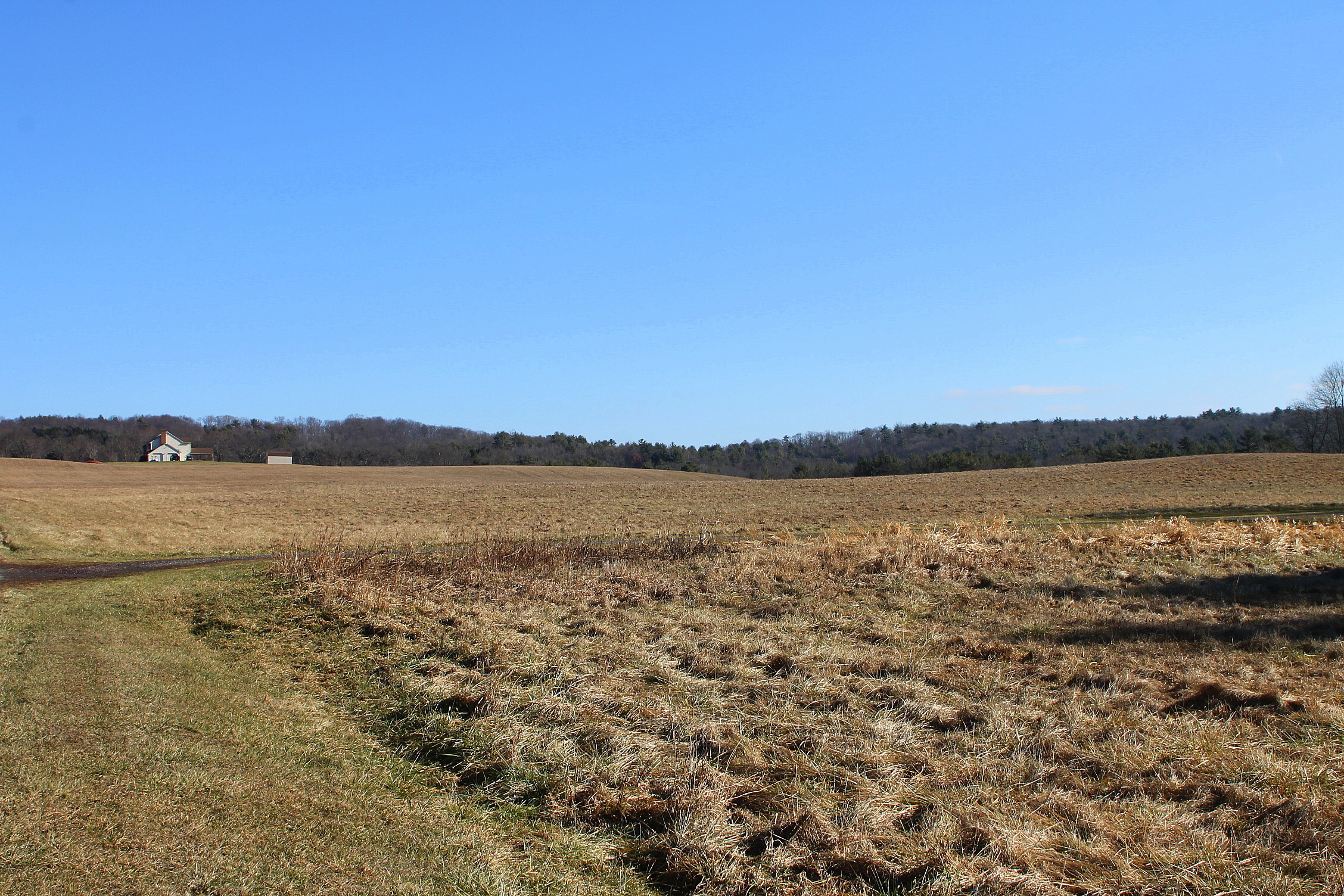
Northeastern Huntington Township

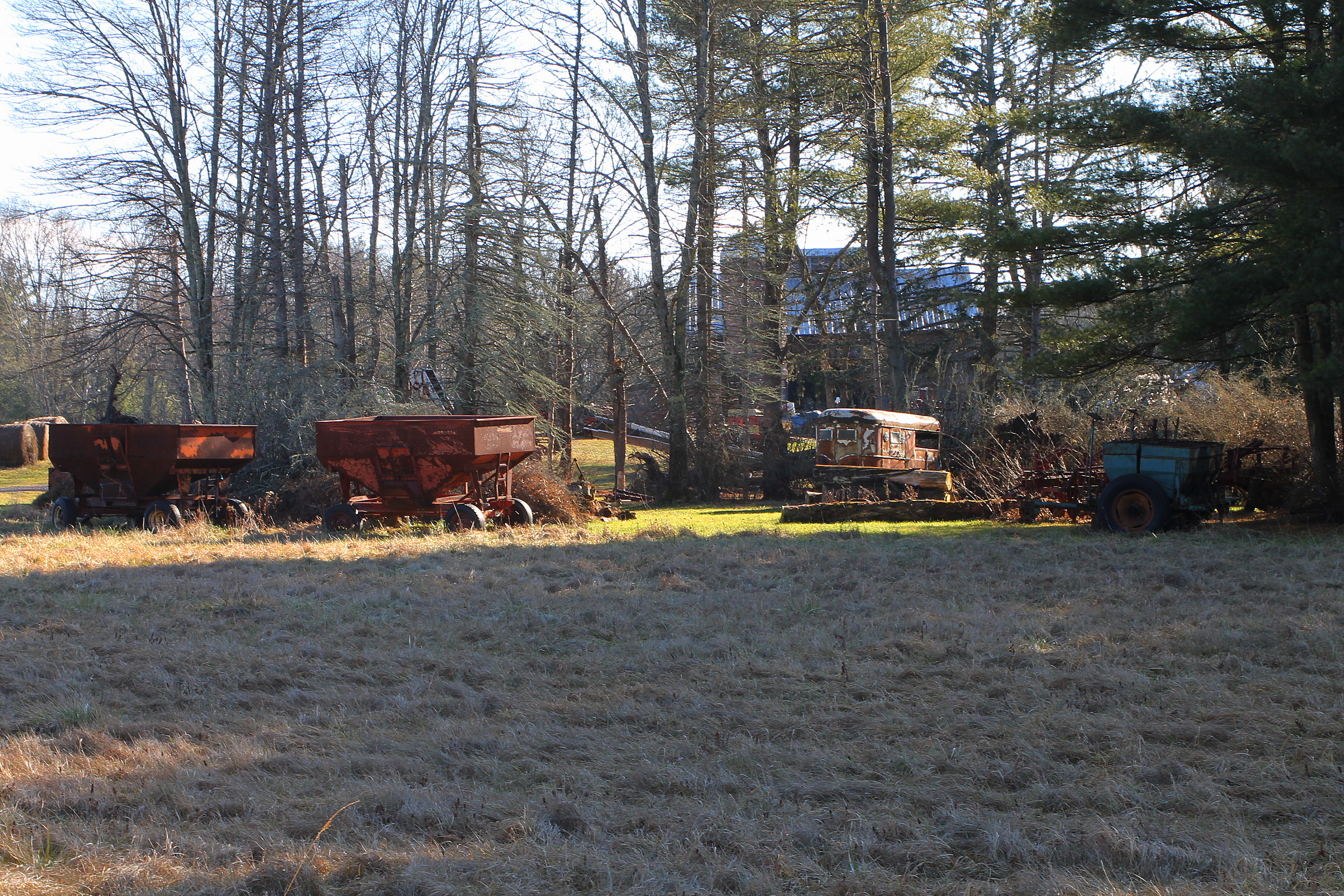
Rusty farm equipment in Huntington Township
