= Oil Creek Township, Crawford County, Pennsylvania =

Township in Pennsylvania, US

Coordinates: 41°40′00″N 79°41′59″W

Oil Creek Township, Crawford County, Pennsylvania Titusville
- Township of Titusville Pennsylvania
- Titusville
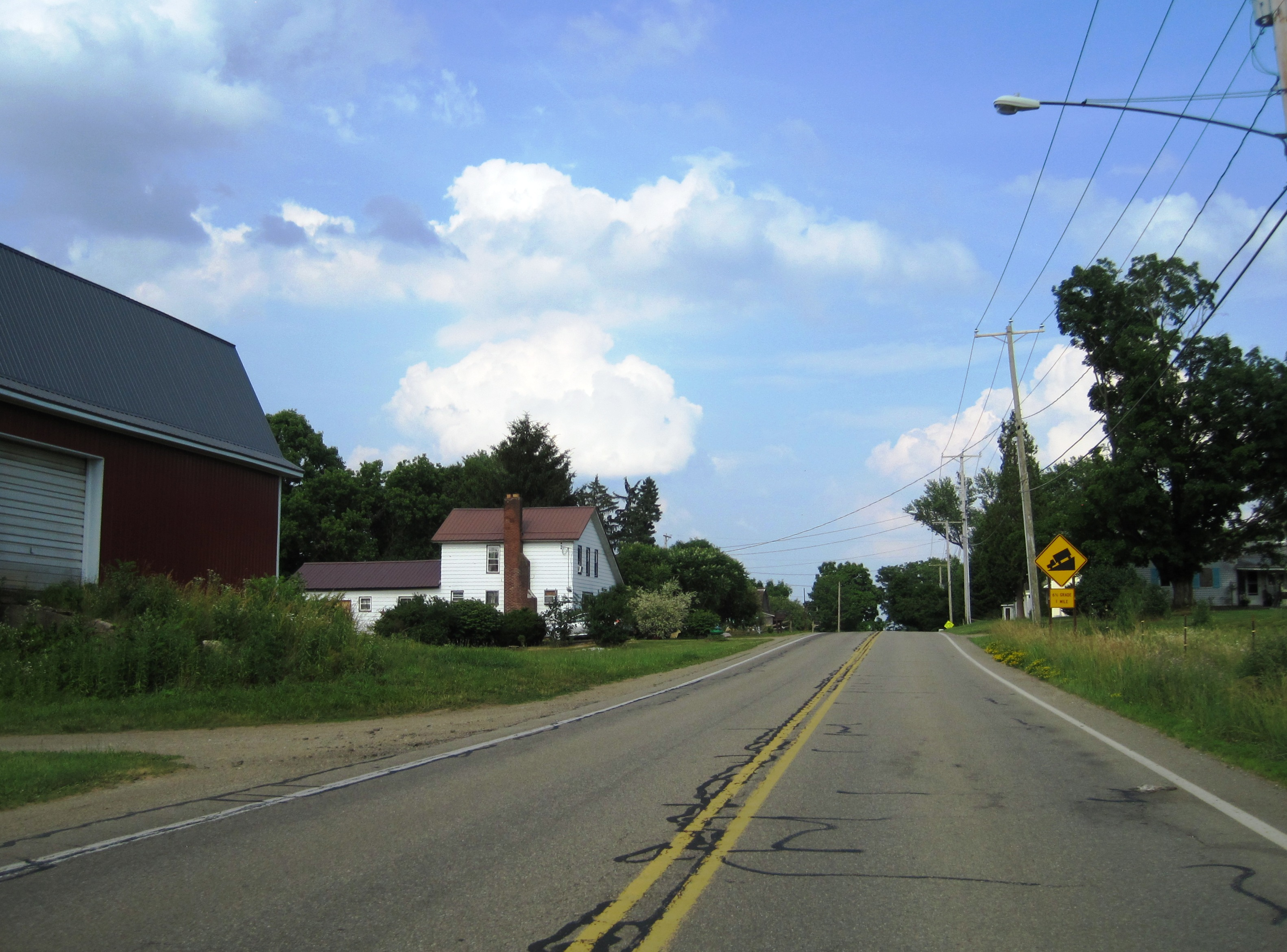
- Gresham, a village within Oil Creek Township

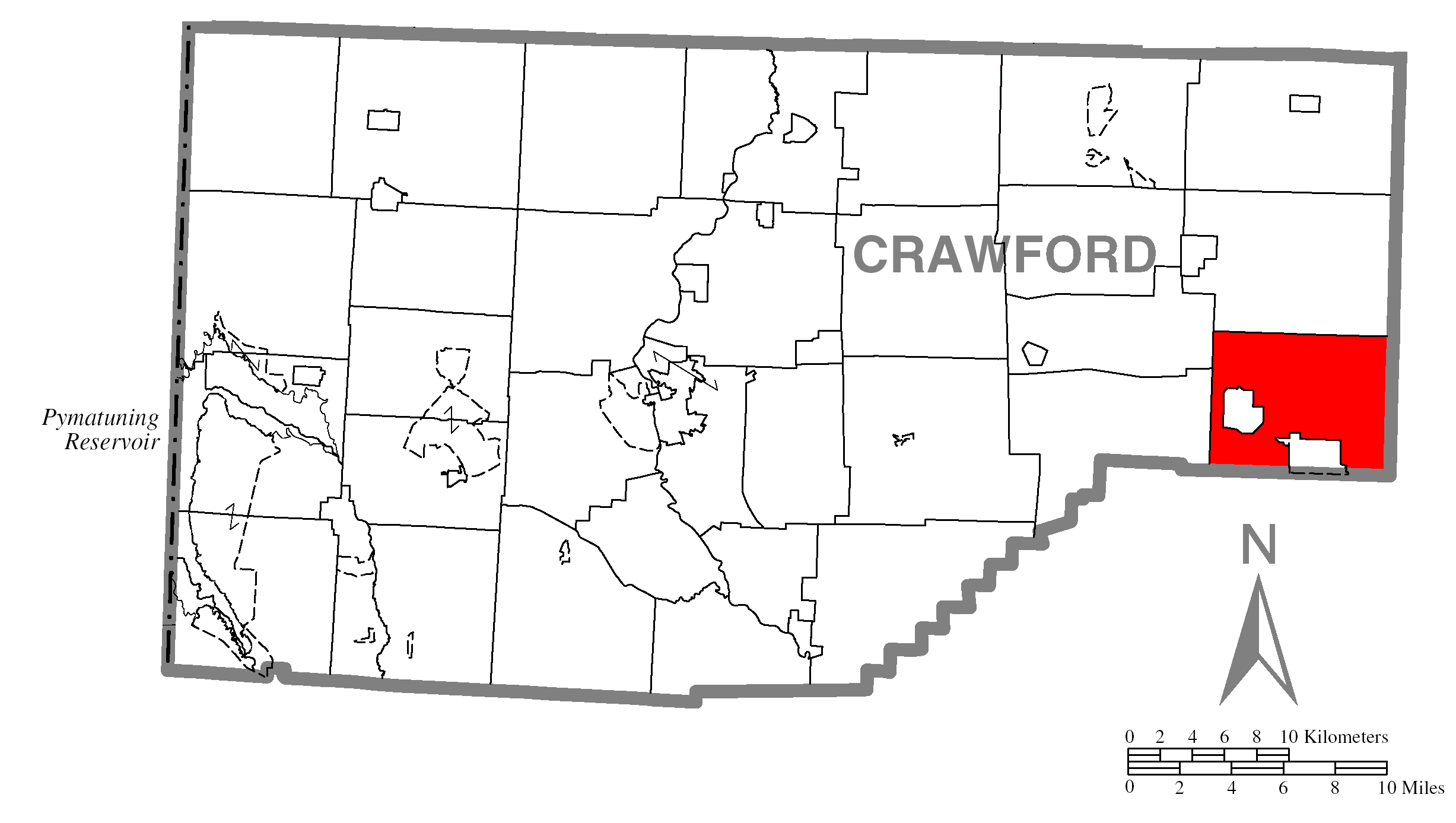
- Location of Oil Creek Township in Crawford County

- Location of Crawford County in Pennsylvania
- Country: United States
- State: Pennsylvania
- County: Crawford

Area
  - Total: 32.20 sq mi (83.39 km^{2})
  - Land: 32.20 sq mi (83.39 km^{2})
  - Water: 0 sq mi (0.00 km^{2})
- Highest elevation (northeastern part of township by White Oak Church): 1,710 ft (520 m)
- Lowest elevation (Pine Creek): 1,170 ft (360 m)

Population (2020)
  - Total: 1,701 ▼
  - Estimate (2024): 1,662
  - Density: 55.8/sq mi (21.53/km^{2})
- Time zone: UTC-4 (EST)
  - Summer (DST): UTC-5 (EDT)
- Area code: 814
- FIPS code: 42-039-56464
- Website: https://oilcreektwpcrawford.org/

Oil Creek Township is a township in Crawford County, Pennsylvania, United States. The population was 1,701 at the 2020 census, a decrease from 1,877 at the 2010 census.

== History ==
The Bridge in Oil Creek Township was listed on the National Register of Historic Places in 1988.

== Geography ==
The township is located in eastern Crawford County and is bordered to the east by Warren County and to the south by Venango County. The township surrounds the borough of Hydetown in the west and borders the city of Titusville, located on the Venango County line, to the north, east, and west.

=== Watersheds ===
Oil Creek, a tributary of the Allegheny River, flows through the township from west to south, passing through Hydetown and Titusville. Pine Creek, a tributary of Oil Creek, and its tributaries, Caldwell Creek, Porky Run, and Stony Hollow Run (both tributaries of Caldwell Creek) drain the northeastern part of the township. Thompson Creek and its tributaries McLaughlin Creek, Shirley Run, and Hummer Creek drain the north and northwestern part of the township. Church Run drains the middle of the township.

According to the United States Census Bureau, the township has a total area of 32.2 square miles (83.4 km^{2}), all land.

== Demographics ==
Historical population
Census	Pop.	Note	%±
2000	1,880		—
2010	1,877		−0.2%
2020	1,701		−9.4%
2024 (est.)	1,662		−2.3%
U.S. Decennial Census

As of the census of 2000, there were 1,880 people, 748 households, and 551 families residing in the township. The population density was 58.2 inhabitants per square mile (22.5/km^{2}). There were 844 housing units at an average density of 26.1 per square mile (10.1/km^{2}). The racial makeup of the township was 98.88% White, 0.21% African American, 0.37% Native American, 0.21% from other races, and 0.32% from two or more races. Hispanic or Latino of any race were 0.16% of the population.

There were 748 households, out of which 32.6% had children under the age of 18 living with them, 64.2% were married couples living together, 5.5% had a female householder with no husband present, and 26.3% were non-families. 23.0% of all households were made up of individuals, and 11.9% had someone living alone who was 65 years of age or older. The average household size was 2.51 and the average family size was 2.94.

In the township the population was spread out, with 25.7% under the age of 18, 6.0% from 18 to 24, 25.4% from 25 to 44, 26.8% from 45 to 64, and 16.1% who were 65 years of age or older. The median age was 41 years. For every 100 females, there were 99.8 males. For every 100 females age 18 and over, there were 98.3 males.

The median income for a household in the township was $33,882, and the median income for a family was $38,500. Males had a median income of $31,790 versus $23,558 for females. The per capita income for the township was $16,682. About 7.9% of families and 10.6% of the population were below the poverty line, including 12.0% of those under age 18 and 6.1% of those age 65 or over.
