= Campbell Creek =

Campbell Creek may refer to:

== Australia ==
- Campbell Creek, Queensland, a locality in the North Burnett Region, Queensland

== United States ==
- Campbell Creek (Alaska), a stream in Anchorage
- Campbell Creek (California), a tributary of the Trinity River
- Campbell Creek (Pine Creek tributary), a stream in Warren County, Pennsylvania
- Campbell Creek (Charles Mix County, South Dakota), a stream
- Campbell Creek (Harding County, South Dakota), a stream
- Campbell Creek, historic name for today's Saratoga Creek, in Santa Clara County, California
