= Gilson Run =

Waterway in Warren County, Pennsylvania

Gilson Run Tributary to Pine Creek
- Location within Pennsylvania Location within the United States

Location
- Country: United States
- State: Pennsylvania
- County: Warren; Forest

Physical characteristics
- Source: divide between Gilson Run and West Hickory Creek
  - location: about 0.5 miles northeast of Pineville, Pennsylvania
  - coordinates: 41°38′22″N 079°29′53″W
  - elevation: 1,490 ft (450 m)
- Mouth: Pine Creek
  - location: about 3 miles southwest of McGraw Corners, Pennsylvania
  - coordinates: 41°38′36″N 079°32′08″W
  - elevation: 1,302 ft (397 m)
- Length: 2.10 mi (3.38 km)
- Basin size: 7.98 square miles (20.7 km^{2})
- Discharge
  - location: Pine Creek
  - average: 7.63 cu ft/s (0.216 m^{3}/s) at mouth with Pine Creek

Basin features
- Progression: northwest
- River system: Allegheny River (Oil Creek)
- Tributaries
  - left: unnamed tributaries
  - right: unnamed tributaries
- Bridges: Tidioute-Enterprise Road

Gilson Run is a 2.10 mi (3.38 km) long tributary to Pine Creek in Warren County and Forest Counties, Pennsylvania.

== Course ==
Gilson Run rises about 0.5 miles northeast of Pineville, Pennsylvania in Forest County and then flows northwest into Warren County to Pine Creek about 3 miles southwest of McGraw Corners, Pennsylvania.

== Watershed ==
Gilson Run drains 7.98 square miles (20.7 km^{2}) of area, receives about 44.9 in/year of precipitation, and has a wetness index of 439.04 and is about 93% forested.

== Additional Maps ==
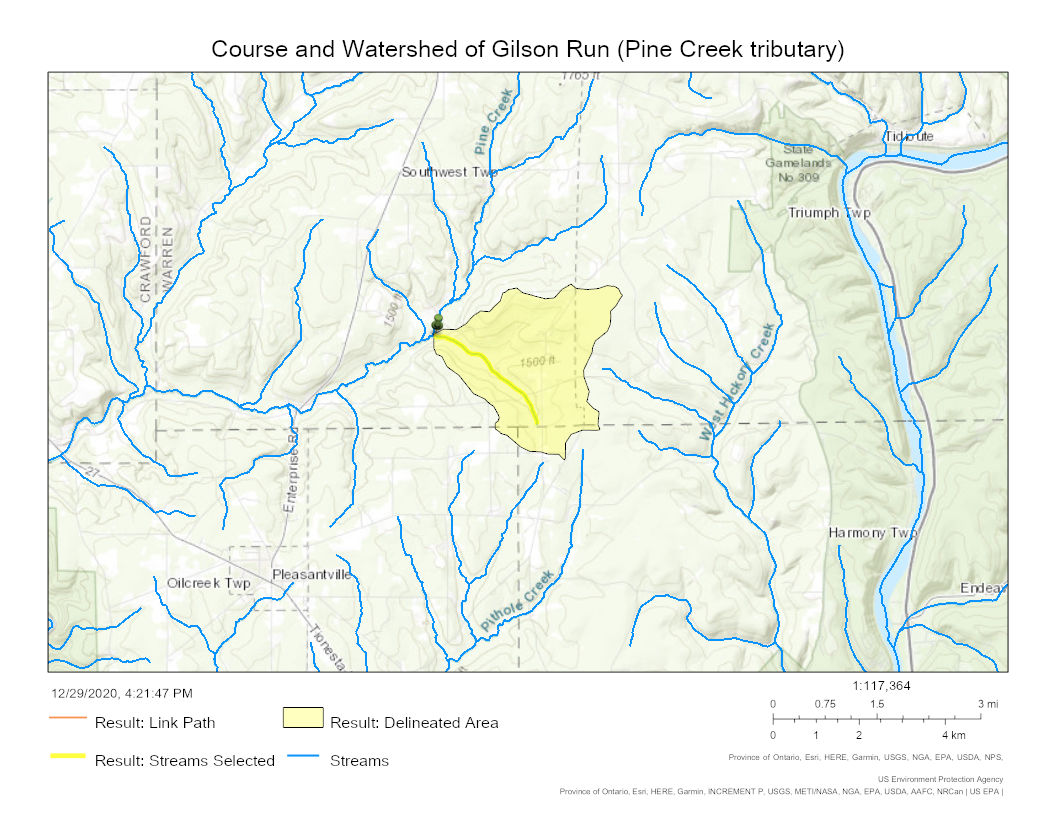
Course and Watershed of Gilson Run (Pine Creek tributary) in Warren and Forest Counties, Pennsylvania
