= Eldred Township, Warren County, Pennsylvania =

Township in Pennsylvania, United States

Coordinates: 41°46′00″N 79°32′59″W

Eldred Township
- Township
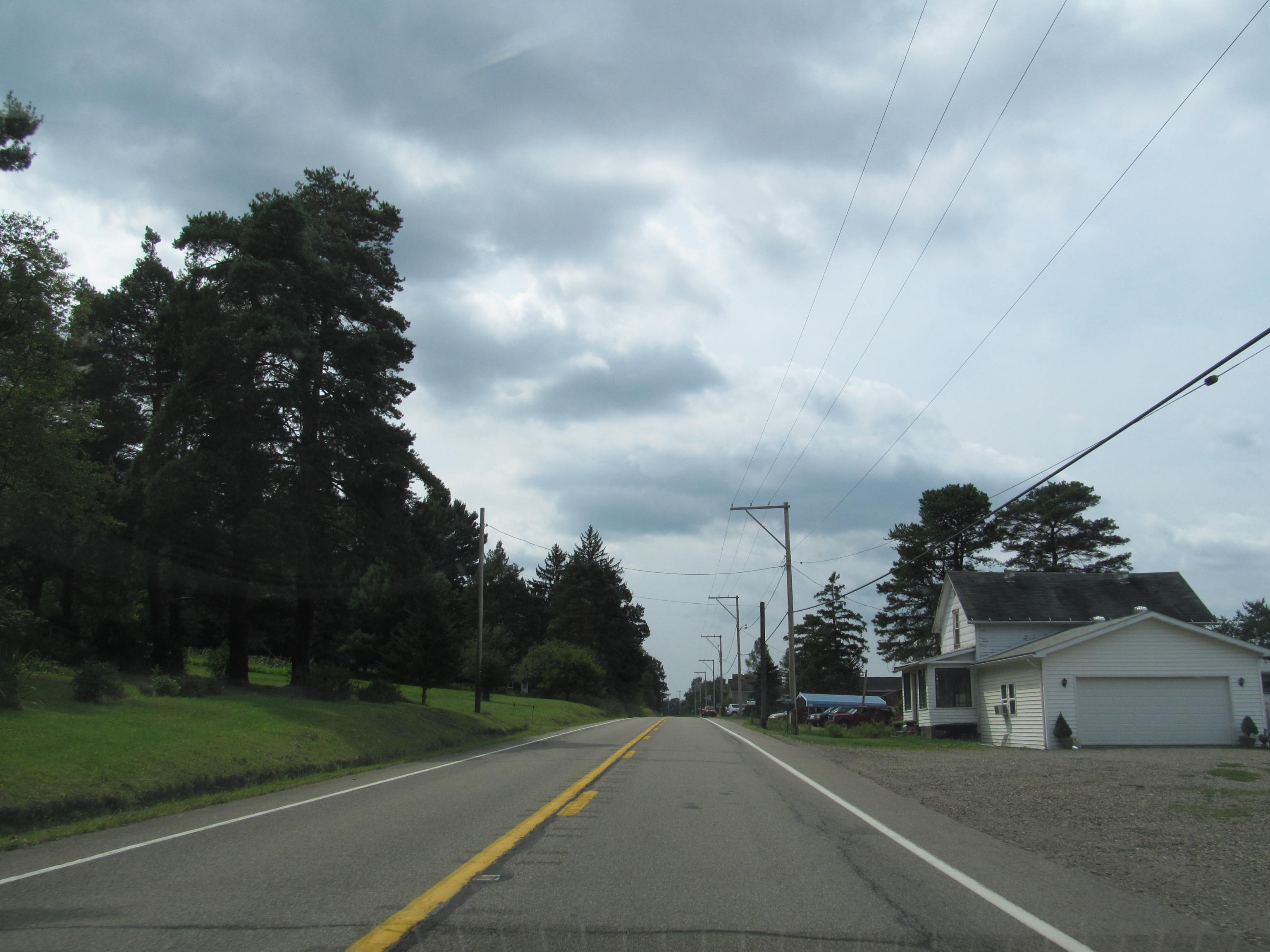
- Westbound PA 27 near the village of Grand Valley

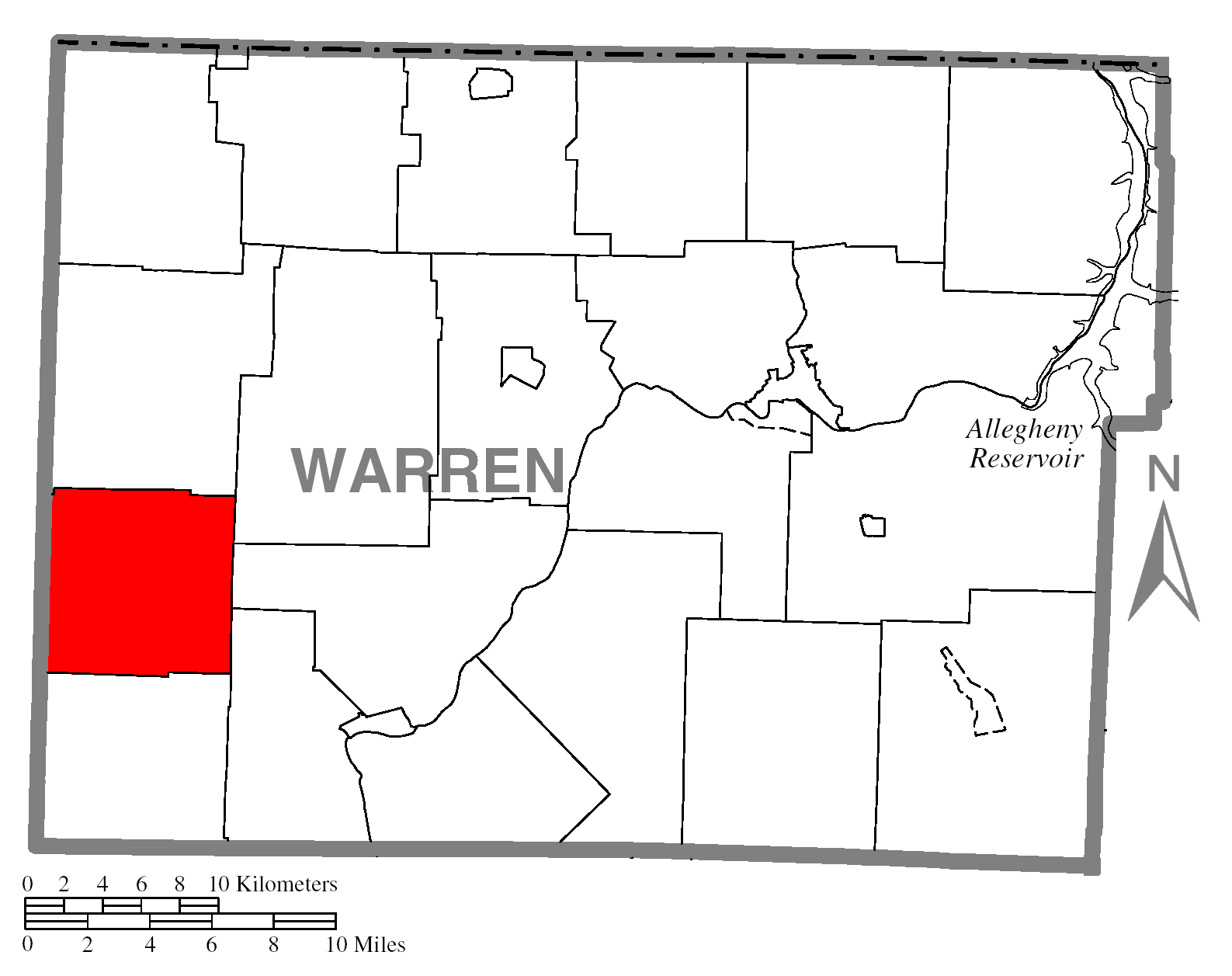
- Location of Eldred Township in Warren County

- Location of Warren County in Pennsylvania
- Country: United States
- State: Pennsylvania
- County: Warren County

Area
  - Total: 36.22 sq mi (93.80 km^{2})
  - Land: 36.22 sq mi (93.80 km^{2})
  - Water: 0 sq mi (0.00 km^{2})
- Highest elevation (high point in northeast corner of township, about 1 mile east-northeast of Sanford, PA): 1,882 ft (574 m)
- Lowest elevation (West Branch Caldwell Creek, where it flows out of the southern part of the township): 1,302 ft (397 m)

Population (2020)
  - Total: 587
  - Estimate (2024): 571
  - Density: 17.2/sq mi (6.63/km^{2})
- Time zone: UTC-4 (EST)
  - Summer (DST): UTC-5 (EDT)
- Area code: 814
- FIPS code: 42-123-22920
- Website: www.eldredtownshipwarrencounty.com

Eldred Township is a township in Warren County, Pennsylvania, United States. The population was 587 at the 2020 census. Down from 650 at the 2010 census.

== Geography ==
According to the United States Census Bureau, the township has a total area of 36.1 square miles (93 km^{2}), all land.

=== Natural Features ===
Eldred Township is located in the southwestern part of Warren County in the Pittsburgh High Plateau. The township is drained primarily by Caldwell Creek, a tributary to Pine Creek, which is a tributary to Oil Creek, a south-flowing tributary of the Allegheny River. Tributaries of Caldwell Creek in Eldred Township include West Branch Caldwell Creek and its tributaries, Three Bridges Run and Middle Branch. Dunderdale Creek joins Caldwell Creek upstream of West Branch Caldwell Creek. The very northeastern part of the townships is drained by Gar Run, a tributary of Brokenstraw Creek and the southeast by George Run of Tidioute Creek. Pine Creek, Oil Creek tributary, drains a small portion of the southeast section. The lowest elevation in Eldred Township is 1,302 ft (397 m) where West Branch Caldwell Creek flows south out of the township. The highest elevation is 1,882 ft (574 m) on a high point at the northeastern part of the township about 1 mile east-northeast of Sanford, Pennsylvania.

== Demographics ==
Historical population
Census	Pop.	Note	%±
2000	790		—
2010	650		−17.7%
2020	587		−9.7%
2024 (est.)	571		−2.7%
U.S. Decennial Census

As of the census of 2000, there were 709 people, 261 households, and 198 families residing in the township. The population density was 19.6 people per square mile (7.6/km^{2}). There were 502 housing units at an average density of 13.9/sq mi (5.4/km^{2}). The racial makeup of the township was 98.17% White, 0.85% African American, 0.28% Native American, 0.42% from other races, and 0.28% from two or more races. Hispanic or Latino of any race were 0.42% of the population.

There were 261 households, out of which 32.2% had children under the age of 18 living with them, 62.8% were married couples living together, 5.7% had a female householder with no husband present, and 24.1% were non-families. 20.7% of all households were made up of individuals, and 7.7% had someone living alone who was 65 years of age or older. The average household size was 2.72 and the average family size was 3.08.

In the township the population was spread out, with 28.5% under the age of 18, 6.8% from 18 to 24, 28.5% from 25 to 44, 24.4% from 45 to 64, and 11.8% who were 65 years of age or older. The median age was 37 years. For every 100 females, there were 109.1 males. For every 100 females age 18 and over, there were 109.5 males.

The median income for a household in the township was $35,000, and the median income for a family was $36,364. Males had a median income of $29,226 versus $18,750 for females. The per capita income for the township was $13,132. About 6.5% of families and 11.9% of the population were below the poverty line, including 15.3% of those under age 18 and none of those age 65 or over.
