= Eldred Township, Pennsylvania =

Eldred Township is the name of some places in the U.S. state of Pennsylvania:

- Eldred Township, Jefferson County, Pennsylvania
- Eldred Township, Lycoming County, Pennsylvania
- Eldred Township, McKean County, Pennsylvania
- Eldred Township, Monroe County, Pennsylvania
- Eldred Township, Schuylkill County, Pennsylvania
- Eldred Township, Warren County, Pennsylvania

== See also ==
- Elder Township, Cambria County, Pennsylvania
