= Dunderdale Creek =

Stream in Pennsylvania, USA

Dunderdale Creek Tributary to Caldwell Creek
- Location of Dunderdale Creek mouth Dunderdale Creek (the United States)

Location
- Country: United States
- State: Pennsylvania
- County: Warren

Physical characteristics
- Source: George Run divide
  - location: about 0.5 mi (0.80 km) east of Starr, Pennsylvania
  - coordinates: 41°44′00″N 079°30′00″W
  - elevation: 1,600 ft (490 m)
- Mouth: Caldwell Creek
  - location: Grand Valley, Pennsylvania
  - coordinates: 41°43′02″N 079°32′44″W
  - elevation: 1,329 ft (405 m)
- Length: 2.75 mi (4.43 km)
- Basin size: 2.52 square miles (6.5 km^{2})
- Discharge
  - location: Caldwell Creek
  - average: 4.83 cu ft/s (0.137 m^{3}/s) at mouth with Caldwell Creek

Basin features
- Progression: west-southwest
- River system: Allegheny River
- Tributaries
  - left: unnamed tributaries
  - right: unnamed tributaries
- Bridges: PA 27

Dunderdale Creek is a 2.75 mi (4.43 km) long 1st order tributary to Caldwell Creek in Warren County, Pennsylvania.

It is the only stream in the United States with this name.

== Course ==
Dunderdale Creek rises about 0.5 mi (0.80 km) east of Starr, Pennsylvania, and then flows west-southwest to join Caldwell Creek at Grand Valley, Pennsylvania.

== Watershed ==
Dunderdale Creek drains 2.52 sq mi (6.5 km^{2}) of area, receives about 44.4 in (113 cm) per year of precipitation, has a wetness index of 419.71, and is approximately 81% forested.

== See also ==
- List of rivers of Pennsylvania
