= Stony Hollow Run (Caldwell Creek tributary) =

Stream in Pennsylvania, USA

Stony Hollow Run Tributary to Caldwell Creek
- Location of Stony Hollow Run mouth Stony Hollow Run (Caldwell Creek tributary) (the United States)

Location
- Country: United States
- State: Pennsylvania
- County: Warren

Physical characteristics
- Source: Hummer Creek divide
  - location: about 2 miles southeast of Vrooman
  - coordinates: 41°42′42″N 079°36′12″W
  - elevation: 1,610 ft (490 m)
- Mouth: Caldwell Creek
  - location: about 1 mile south of Selkirk, Pennsylvania
  - coordinates: 41°40′24″N 079°35′32″W
  - elevation: 1,248 ft (380 m)
- Length: 2.87 mi (4.62 km)
- Basin size: 2.56 square miles (6.6 km^{2})
- Discharge
  - location: Caldwell Creek
  - average: 5.06 cu ft/s (0.143 m^{3}/s) at mouth with Caldwell Creek

Basin features
- Progression: southeast
- River system: Allegheny River
- Tributaries
  - left: unnamed tributaries
  - right: Swanson Run
- Bridges: Flat Road

Stony Hollow Run is a 2.87 mi (4.62 km) long 1st order tributary to Caldwell Creek in Warren County, Pennsylvania, United States.

== Course ==
Stony Hollow Run rises about 2 miles southeast of Vrooman, Pennsylvania and then flows southeast to join Caldwell Creek about 1 mile southwest of Selkirk, Pennsylvania.

== Watershed ==
Stony Hollow Run drains 2.56 square miles (6.6 km^{2}) of area, receives about 45.1 in/year of precipitation, has a wetness index of 419.01, and is about 76% forested.

== See also ==
- List of rivers of Pennsylvania
