= Golby Run =

Waterway in Warren County, Pennsylvania

Golby Run Tributary to Pine Creek
- Location within Pennsylvania Location within the United States

Location
- Country: United States
- State: Pennsylvania
- County: Warren; Venango

Physical characteristics
- Source: divide between Golby Run and Pithole Creek
  - location: about 0.5 miles northeast of Pleasantville, Pennsylvania
  - coordinates: 41°36′05″N 079°34′04″W
  - elevation: 1,625 ft (495 m)
- Mouth: Pine Creek
  - location: about 0.5 miles east of Enterprise, Pennsylvania
  - coordinates: 41°37′55″N 079°33′44″W
  - elevation: 1,262 ft (385 m)
- Length: 1.37 mi (2.20 km)
- Basin size: 2.28 square miles (5.9 km^{2})
- Discharge
  - location: Pine Creek
  - average: 4.43 cu ft/s (0.125 m^{3}/s) at mouth with Pine Creek

Basin features
- Progression: north
- River system: Allegheny River (Oil Creek)
- Tributaries
  - left: unnamed tributaries
  - right: unnamed tributaries
- Bridges: Carson Road, Tidioute-Enterprise Road

Golby Run is a 1.37 mi (2.20 km) long tributary to Pine Creek in Warren County and Venango Counties, Pennsylvania.

== Course ==
Golby Run rises about 0.5 miles northeast of Pleasantville, Pennsylvania in Venango County and then flows north into Warren County to Pine Creek about 0.5 miles east of Enterprise, Pennsylvania.

== Watershed ==
Golby Run drains 2.28 square miles (5.9 km^{2}) of area, receives about 44.8 in/year of precipitation, and has a wetness index of 434.35 and is about 87% forested.

== Additional Maps ==
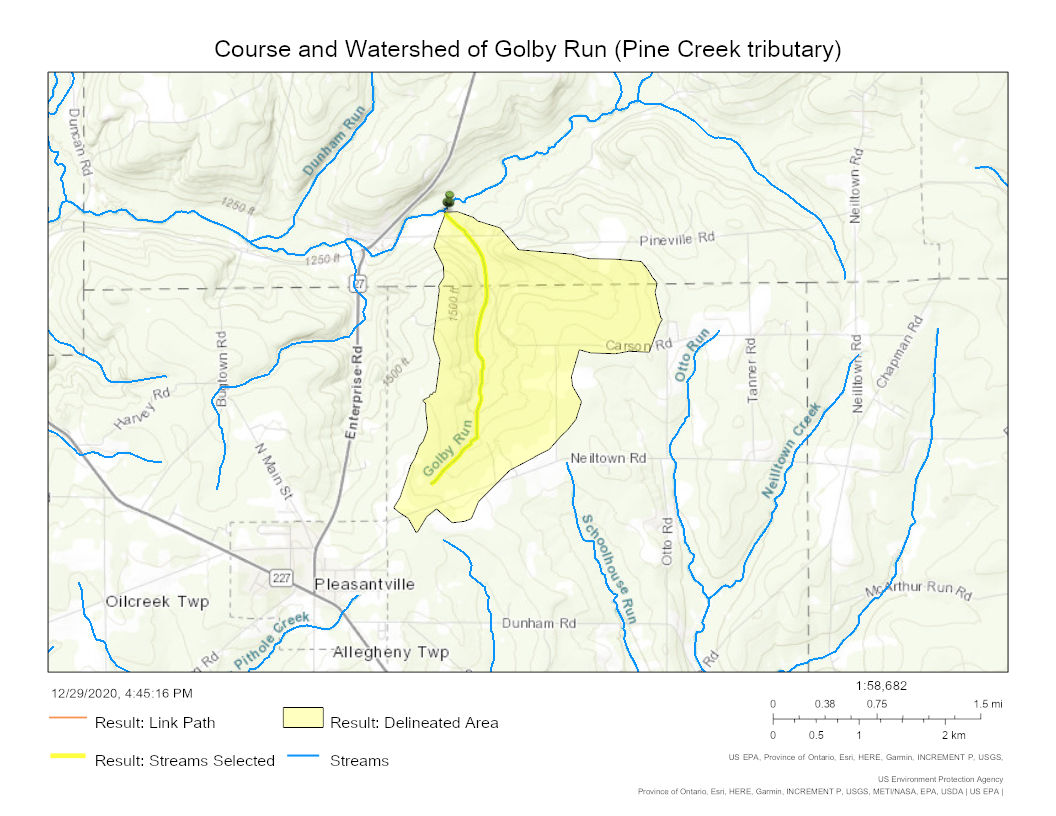
Course and Watershed of Golby Run (Pine Creek tributary) in Warren and Venango Counties, Pennsylvania
