= Dunham Run (Pine Creek tributary) =

Waterway in Warren County, Pennsylvania

Dunham Run Tributary to Pine Creek
- Location within Pennsylvania Location within the United States

Location
- Country: United States
- State: Pennsylvania
- County: Warren

Physical characteristics
- Source: divide between Gilson Run and West Hickory Creek
  - location: about 0.5 miles northeast of Pineville, Pennsylvania
  - coordinates: 41°40′06″N 079°33′51″W
  - elevation: 1,625 ft (495 m)
- Mouth: Pine Creek
  - location: about 2 miles east of Dotyville, Pennsylvania
  - coordinates: 41°37′44″N 079°35′23″W
  - elevation: 1,225 ft (373 m)
- Length: 3.32 mi (5.34 km)
- Basin size: 3.34 square miles (8.7 km^{2})
- Discharge
  - location: Pine Creek
  - average: 6.40 cu ft/s (0.181 m^{3}/s) at mouth with Pine Creek

Basin features
- Progression: generally south
- River system: Allegheny River (Oil Creek)
- Tributaries
  - left: unnamed tributaries
  - right: unnamed tributaries

Dunham Run is a 3.32 mi (5.34 km) long tributary to Pine Creek in Warren County, Pennsylvania.

== Course ==
Dunham Run rises about 2 miles east of Dotyville, Pennsylvania in Warren County and then flows south to Pine Creek about 0.5 miles west of Enterprise, Pennsylvania.

== Watershed ==
Dunham Run drains 3.34 square miles (8.7 km^{2}) of area, receives about 44.8 in/year of precipitation, and has a wetness index of 435.95 and is about 92% forested.

== Additional Maps ==
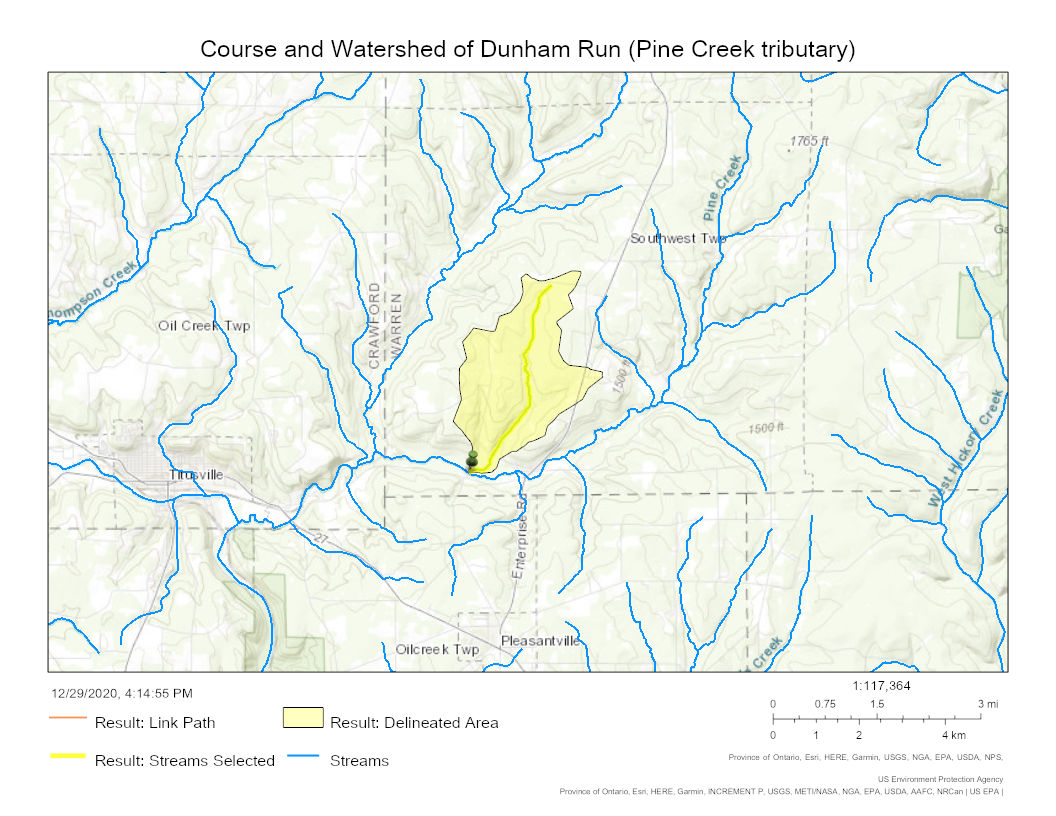
Course and Watershed of Dunham Run (Pine Creek tributary) in Crawford County, Pennsylvania
