= Porky Run =

Stream in Pennsylvania, USA

Porky Run Tributary to Caldwell Creek
- Location of Porky Run mouth Porky Run (the United States)

Location
- Country: United States
- State: Pennsylvania
- County: Crawford

Physical characteristics
- Source: Hummer Creek divide
  - location: about 1.5 miles east of Shelmandine Springs, Pennsylvania
  - coordinates: 41°41′03″N 079°37′46″W
  - elevation: 1,590 ft (480 m)
- Mouth: Caldwell Creek
  - location: about 1.5 miles northeast of East Titusville, Pennsylvania
  - coordinates: 41°38′22″N 079°37′04″W
  - elevation: 1,205 ft (367 m)
- Length: 3.19 mi (5.13 km)
- Basin size: 3.19 square miles (8.3 km^{2})
- Discharge
  - location: Caldwell Creek
  - average: 4.82 cu ft/s (0.136 m^{3}/s) at mouth with Caldwell Creek

Basin features
- Progression: southeast
- River system: Allegheny River
- Tributaries
  - left: unnamed tributaries
  - right: unnamed tributaries
- Bridges: Spring Creek Road, Sutton Road, Keyes Road, Dotyville Road

Porky Run is a 2.46 mi (3.96 km) long 1st order tributary to Caldwell Creek in Crawford County, Pennsylvania.

== Course ==
Porky Run rises about 1.5 miles east of Shelmandine Springs, Pennsylvania and then flows southeast to join Caldwell Creek about 1.5 miles northeast of East Titusville, Pennsylvania.

== Watershed ==
Porky Run drains 3.19 square miles (8.3 km^{2}) of area, receives about 45.1 in/year of precipitation, has a wetness index of 429.93, and is about 70% forested.

== See also ==
- List of rivers of Pennsylvania
