= Grand Valley, Pennsylvania =

Unincorporated community in Pennsylvania, US

- Unincorporated community
- Location within Pennsylvania Location within the United States
- Coordinates: 41°43′16″N 79°32′15″W
- Country: United States
- State: Pennsylvania
- County: Warren County
- Township: Eldred Township
- Elevation: 1,401 ft (427 m)
- Time zone: UTC-5 (EST)
  - Summer (DST): UTC-4 (EDT)
- Zip code: `16420
- GNIS feature ID: 1175931

Grand Valley is an unincorporated community within Eldred Township, Warren County, Pennsylvania, United States.
