= Bridge in Oil Creek Township =

Historic metal truss bridge in United States of America

- U.S. National Register of Historic Places
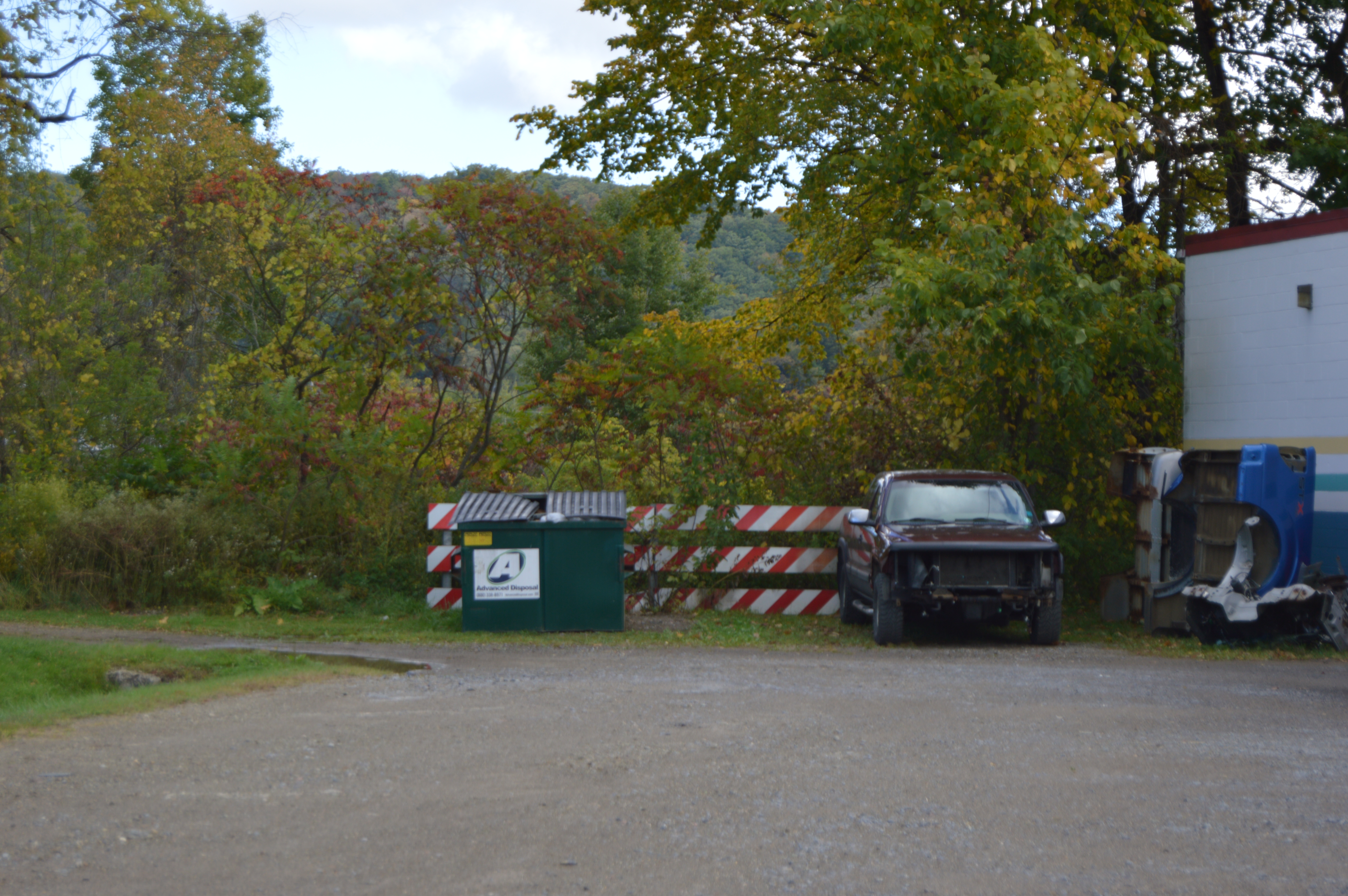
- Barrier at the site of the former bridge

- Location within Pennsylvania Location within the United States
- Location: State Route 2020 over Oil Creek, Oil Creek Township, Pennsylvania
- Coordinates: 41°37′46″N 79°42′10″W
- Area: less than one acre
- Built: 1896
- Architectural style: Pratt through truss
- MPS: Highway Bridges Owned by the Commonwealth of Pennsylvania, Department of Transportation TR
- NRHP reference No.: 88000833
- Added to NRHP: June 22, 1988

Bridge in Oil Creek Township, also known as Holiday Bridge, was a historic metal truss bridge spanning Oil Creek at Oil Creek Township, Crawford County, Pennsylvania. It was built in 1896, and was a single span, Pratt through truss bridge measuring 124-foot-long (38 m). It was built by the Massillon Bridge Company of Massillon, Ohio. It has been removed from its site.

It was added to the National Register of Historic Places in 1988.
