= Campbell Creek (Harding County, South Dakota) =

Stream in South Dakota, U.S.

Coordinates: 45°47′12″N 103°29′54″W

Campbell Creek is a stream in the U.S. state of South Dakota.

== History ==
Campbell Creek was named in honor of an early rancher.

== See also ==
- List of rivers of South Dakota
