= Campbell Creek (Charles Mix County, South Dakota) =

Stream in South Dakota, U.S.

Coordinates: 43°09′56″N 98°47′49″W

Campbell Creek is a stream in the U.S. state of South Dakota.

== History ==
Campbell Creek has the name of Gen. Charles T. Campbell, a pioneer who settled near the stream.

== See also ==
- List of rivers of South Dakota
