= West Branch Caldwell Creek =

Stream in Pennsylvania, USA

West Branch Caldwell Creek Tributary to Caldwell Creek
- Location of West Branch Caldwell Creek mouth West Branch Caldwell Creek (the United States)

Location
- Country: United States
- State: Pennsylvania
- County: Warren

Physical characteristics
- Source: East Branch Spring Creek divide
  - location: about 2 miles southeast of Cobbs Corners, Pennsylvania
  - coordinates: 41°47′10″N 079°31′22″W
  - elevation: 1,730 ft (530 m)
- Mouth: Caldwell Creek
  - location: about 0.25 miles northeast of Selkirk, Pennsylvania
  - coordinates: 41°41′36″N 079°34′10″W
  - elevation: 1,238 ft (377 m)
- Length: 8.80 mi (14.16 km)
- Basin size: 19.45 square miles (50.4 km^{2})
- Discharge
  - location: Caldwell Creek
  - average: 36.13 cu ft/s (1.023 m^{3}/s) at mouth with Caldwell Creek

Basin features
- Progression: generally south
- River system: Allegheny River
- Tributaries
  - left: Middle Branch
  - right: Three Bridge Run
- Bridges: Sanford Road, Eldred Center Road, Eureka Road, Gossville Road, Flat Road

West Branch Caldwell Creek is a 8.80 mi (14.16 km) long 2nd order tributary to Caldwell Creek in Warren County, Pennsylvania. It is the only stream of this name in the United States.

== Course ==
West Branch Caldwell Creek rises about 2 miles southeast of Cobbs Corners, Pennsylvania and then flows generally south to join Caldwell Creek about 0.25 miles northeast of Selkirk, Pennsylvania.

== Watershed ==
West Branch Caldwell Creek drains 19.45 square miles (50.4 km^{2}) of area, receives about 44.8 in/year of precipitation, has a wetness index of 422.53, and is about 73% forested.

== See also ==
- List of rivers of Pennsylvania
