= Campbell Creek (Pine Creek tributary) =

River in Warren County, Pennsylvania

Campbell Creek Tributary to Pine Creek
- Location within Pennsylvania Location within the United States

Location
- Country: United States
- State: Pennsylvania
- County: Warren
- Township: Southwest

Physical characteristics
- Source: divide between Campbell Creek and Caldwell Creek
  - location: about 2.5 miles west of Whitehead Corners, Pennsylvania
  - coordinates: 41°41′05″N 079°22′19″W
  - elevation: 1,580 ft (480 m)
- Mouth: Pine Creek
  - location: about 2.5 miles southwest of McGraw Corners, Pennsylvania
  - coordinates: 41°39′00″N 079°31′50″W
  - elevation: 1,325 ft (404 m)
- Length: 2.50 mi (4.02 km)
- Basin size: 1.78 square miles (4.6 km^{2})
- Discharge
  - location: Pine Creek
  - average: 3.51 cu ft/s (0.099 m^{3}/s) at mouth with Pine Creek

Basin features
- Progression: south
- River system: Allegheny River (Oil Creek)
- Tributaries
  - left: unnamed tributaries
  - right: unnamed tributaries
- Waterbodies: Clear Lake
- Bridges: Seldom Seen Road

Campbell Creek is a 2.50 mi (4.02 km) long 1st order tributary to Pine Creek in Warren County, Pennsylvania.

== Course ==
Campbell Creek rises on the Caldwell Creek divide about 2.5 miles west of Whitehead Corners, Pennsylvania. Campbell Creek then flows south to Pine Creek about 2.5 miles southwest of McGraw Corners, Pennsylvania.

== Watershed ==
Campbell Creek drains 1.78 square miles (4.6 km^{2}) of area, receives about 44.8 in/year of precipitation, has a topographic wetness index of 434.12 and is about 92% forested.
