= Pineville, Pennsylvania =

Unincorporated community in Pennsylvania, US

- Unincorporated community
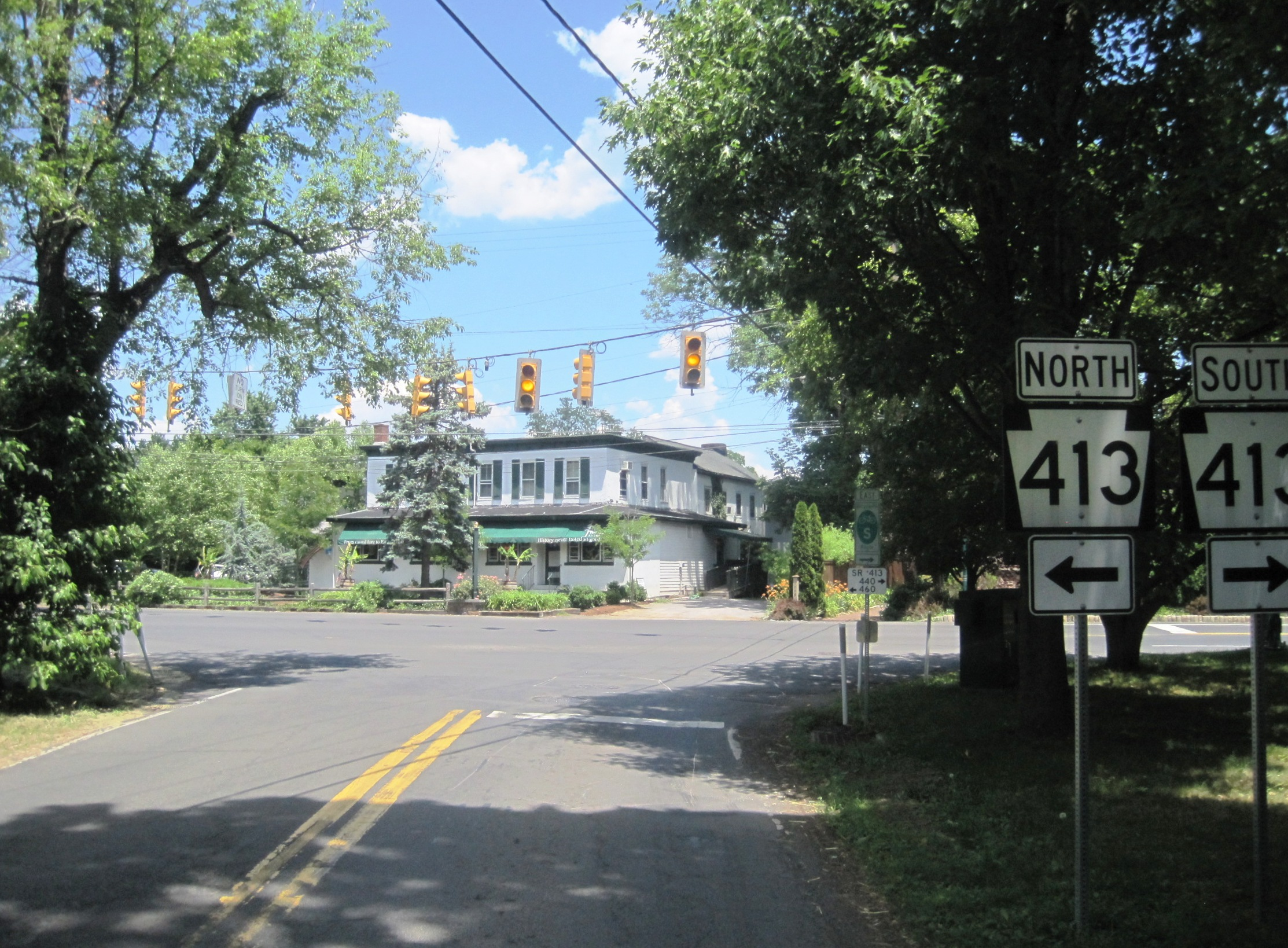
- Corner of Township Line Road, Pineville Road, and PA 413

- Location within Pennsylvania
- Coordinates: 40°17′46″N 75°00′21″W
- Country: United States
- State: Pennsylvania
- County: Bucks
- Township: Buckingham and Wrightstown
- Elevation: 243 ft (74 m)
- Time zone: UTC-5 (Eastern (EST))
  - Summer (DST): UTC-4 (EDT)
- ZIP code: 18946
- Area codes: 215, 267 and 445
- GNIS feature ID: 1204406

Pineville is a village on the border between Buckingham and Wrightstown townships in Bucks County, Pennsylvania, United States.

== Name ==
Pineville was known as "The Pines" around 1776 and was called by this name for many years. Pineville was so named from a cluster of pine trees that stood about 150 yards south of the crossroads. These trees were cut down about 1846. Around 1806, it was called "Pinetown" and consisted of a stone store-house adjoining a frame dwelling both kept by Jacob Heston, near the site of Jesse P. Carver's store.

The dwelling house and tailor-shop of William Trego stood on the point between the Centreville turnpike and the Buckingham road. Jesse S. Heston kept store in the bar-room of the present tavern.

The forging of the iron work for the county jail at Doylestown that was erected in 1812, was done at Pineville with iron hauled in from Bethlehem in farm wagons. The iron works later became a nail manufacturer.

== Landmarks ==
Another dwelling, and David Stogdale's farm house, with a school-house near the present store, and removed in 1842, completed the community. It had neither tavern, wheelwright, nor blacksmith. The post office was established after 1830, with Samuel Tomlinson the first postmaster, at which point the name of the village was formally changed to Pineville to prevent confusion with an established town. The first tavern, licensed in 1835 or 1836, was kept by Tomlinson, after having been for several years previously a temperance house.

John Thompson kept store at the Pines before the Revolution; he also owned a mill on the Neshaminy.
