= Caldwell Creek (Pennsylvania) =

Caldwell Creek Tributary to Pine Creek
- Location of Caldwell Creek mouth Caldwell Creek (Pennsylvania) (the United States)

Location
- Country: United States
- State: Pennsylvania
- County: Warren; Crawford

Physical characteristics
- Source: divide between Caldwell Creek, Gar Run, and Tidioute Creek
  - location: Pittsfield Township, Warren County, Pennsylvania
  - coordinates: 41°46′03″N 79°27′35″W
  - elevation: 1,720 ft (520 m)
- Mouth: Pine Creek
  - location: Eldred Township, Warren County, Pennsylvania
  - coordinates: 41°41′37″N 79°34′10″W
  - elevation: 1,192 ft (363 m)
- Length: 15.28 mi (24.59 km)
- Basin size: 47.24 square miles (122.4 km^{2})
- Discharge
  - location: Pine Creek
  - average: 84.44 cu ft/s (2.391 m^{3}/s) at mouth with Pine Creek

Basin features
- Progression: generally south
- River system: Allegheny River (Oil Creek)
- Tributaries
  - left: Dunderdale Creek
  - right: West Branch Caldwell Creek; Stony Hollow Run; Porky Run
- Bridges: Tidioute Creek Road, PA 27, Sanford Road, Eldred Center Road, Selkirk Road, Dotyville Hill Road, Duncan Road

Caldwell Creek is a 3rd order tributary of Pine Creek in Warren County and Crawford County, Pennsylvania in the United States.

== Variant names ==
According to the Geographic Names Information System, it has also been known historically as:

- East Branch Caldwell Creek

== Course ==
Caldwell Creek rises about 0.5 miles south of Torpedo, Pennsylvania in Warren County and then flows south through Warren County into Crawford County to Pine Creek about 1 mile northeast of East Titusville, Pennsylvania.

== Watershed ==
Caldwell Creek drains 47.24 square miles (122.4 km^{2}) of area, receives about 44.7 in/year of precipitation, and has a wetness index of 422.49 and is about 75% forested.

== See also ==
- List of rivers of Pennsylvania

== Additional Maps ==
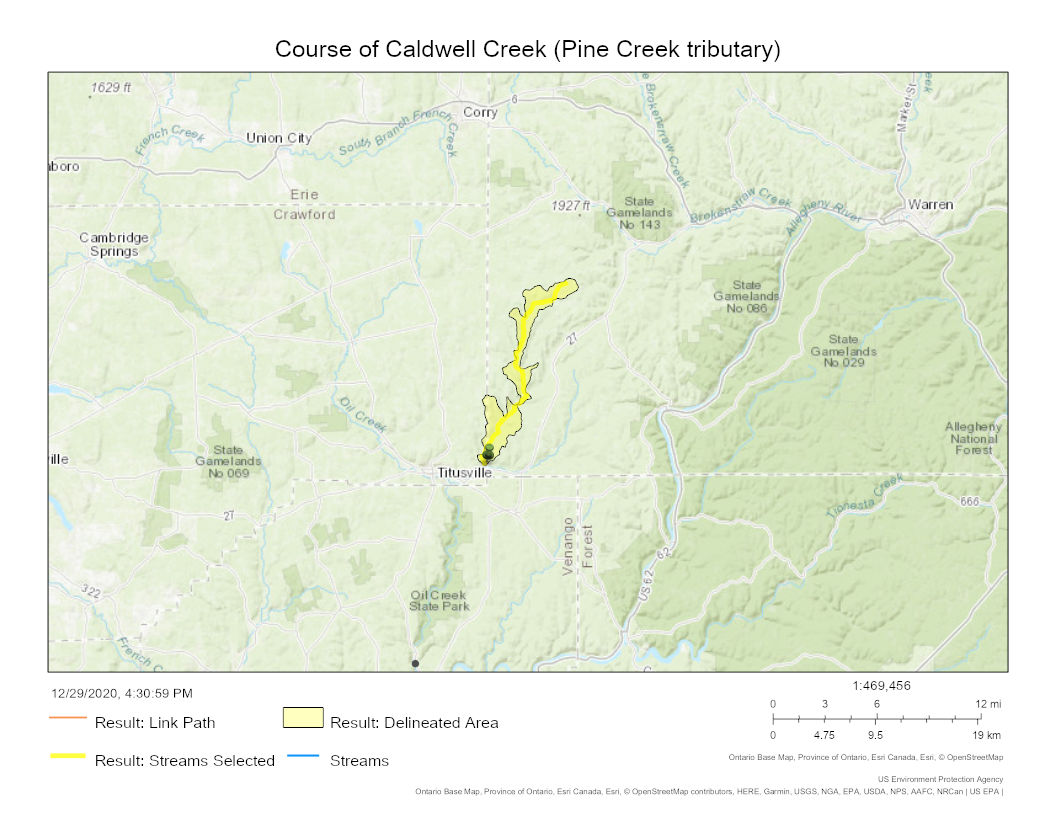
Course of Caldwell Creek (Pine Creek tributary) in Crawford and Warren Counties, Pennsylvania

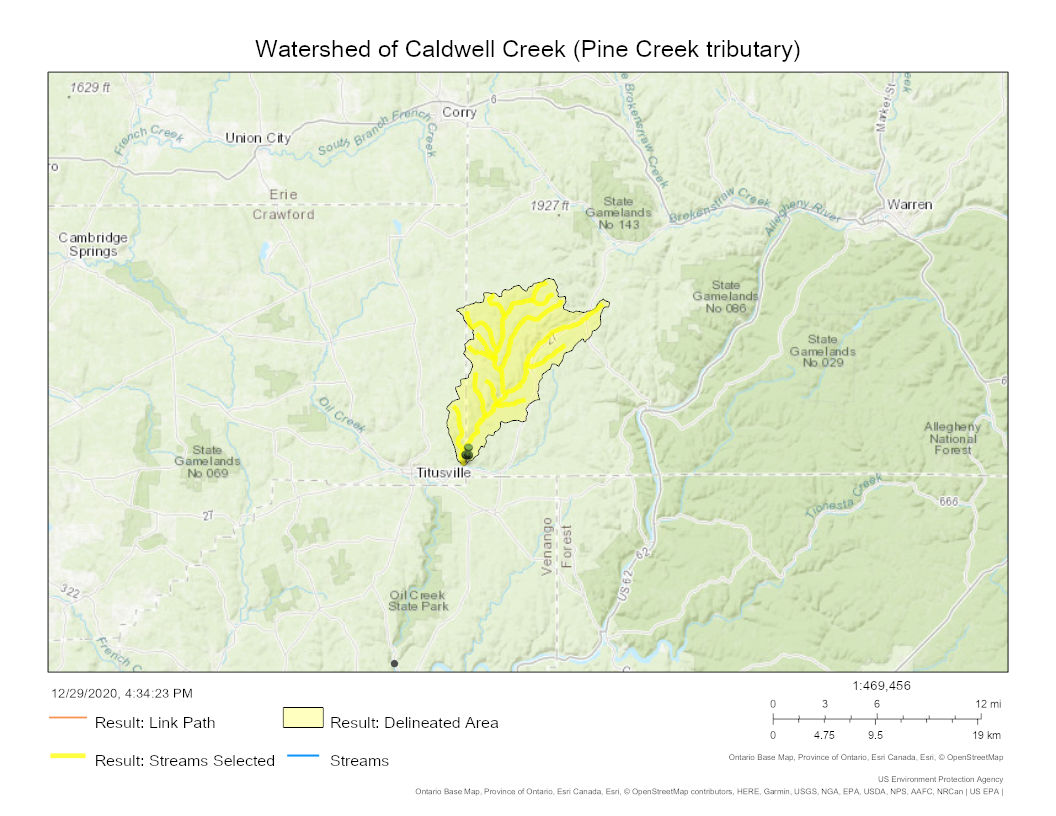
Watershed of Caldwell Creek (Pine Creek tributary) in Crawford and Warren Counties, Pennsylvania
