= Hummer Creek (Thompson Creek tributary) =

Stream in Pennsylvania, USA

Hummer Creek Tributary to Thompson Creek
- Location of Hummer Creek mouth Hummer Creek (Thompson Creek tributary) (the United States)

Location
- Country: United States
- State: Pennsylvania
- County: Crawford

Physical characteristics
- Source: West Branch Caldwell Creek divide
  - location: about 2 miles east-southeast of Vrooman, Pennsylvania
  - coordinates: 41°43′19″N 079°36′52″W
  - elevation: 1,660 ft (510 m)
- Mouth: Thompson Creek
  - location: Shelamndine Springs, Pennsylvania
  - coordinates: 41°41′10″N 079°39′47″W
  - elevation: 1,328 ft (405 m)
- Length: 3.83 mi (6.16 km)
- Basin size: 5.50 square miles (14.2 km^{2})
- Discharge
  - location: Thompson Creek
  - average: 10.76 cu ft/s (0.305 m^{3}/s) at mouth with Thompson Creek

Basin features
- Progression: southwest
- River system: Allegheny River
- Tributaries
  - left: unnamed tributaries
  - right: unnamed tributaries
- Bridges: Cloverdale Road, Hummer Road, Townline Road

Hummer Creek is a 3.83 mi (6.16 km) long 2nd order tributary to Thompson Creek in Crawford County, Pennsylvania.

== Variant names ==
According to the Geographic Names Information System, it has also been known historically as:

- Hummer Run

== Course ==
Hummer Creek rises about 2 miles east-southeast of Vrooman, Pennsylvania and then flows southwest to join Thompson Creek at Shelmandine Springs.

== Watershed ==
Hummer Creek drains 5.50 square miles (14.2 km^{2}) of area, receives about 45.1 in/year of precipitation, has a wetness index of 459.72, and is about 54% forested.

== See also ==
- List of rivers of Pennsylvania

== Additional Maps ==
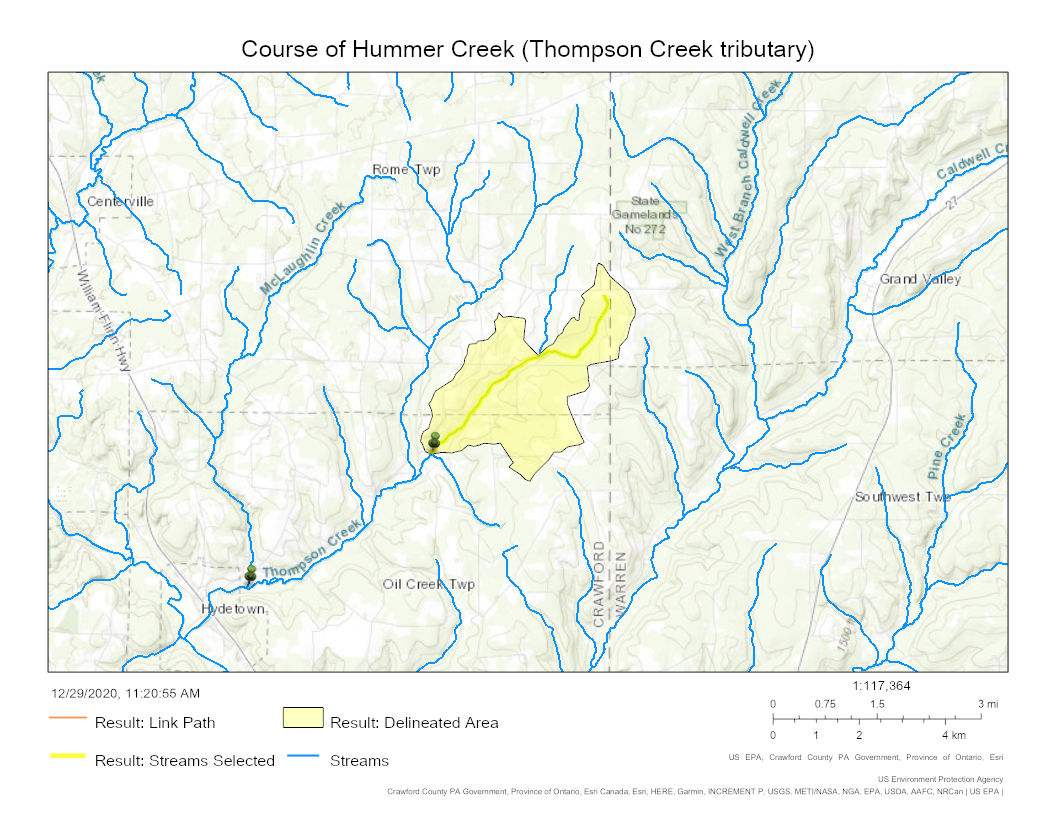
Course of Hummer Creek (Thompson Creek tributary) in Crawford County, Pennsylvania

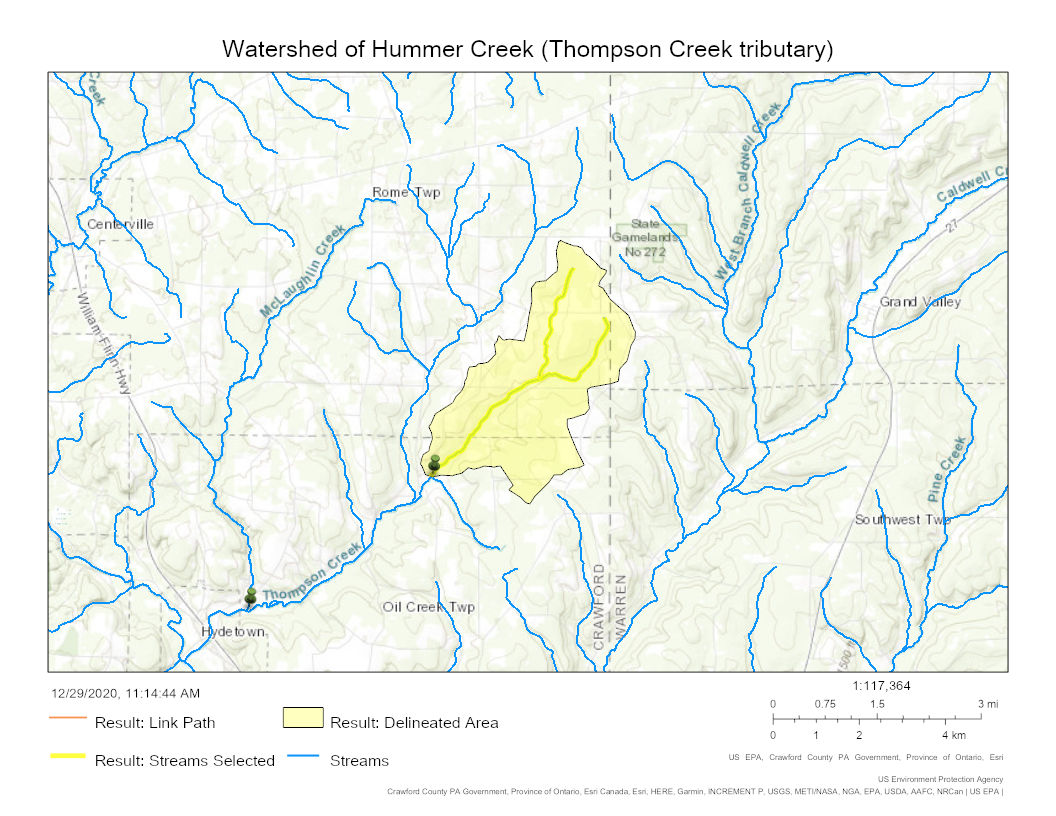
Watershed of Hummer Creek (Thompson Creek tributary) in Crawford County, Pennsylvania
