= Pine Creek (Oil Creek tributary) =

Waterway in Crawford County, Pennsylvania

Pine Creek Tributary to Oil Creek
- Location within Pennsylvania Location within the United States

Location
- Country: United States
- State: Pennsylvania
- County: Crawford; Warren
- City: Titusville

Physical characteristics
- Source: divide between Caldwell Creek and Tidioute Creek
  - location: near Excelsior Corners, Pennsylvania
  - coordinates: 41°42′54″N 079°30′56″W
  - elevation: 1,670 ft (510 m)
- Mouth: southeast of Titusville, Pennsylvania
  - location: Titusville, Pennsylvania
  - coordinates: 41°37′05″N 079°39′10″W
  - elevation: 1,150 ft (350 m)
- Length: 13.8 mi (22.2 km)
- Basin size: 85.7 square miles (222 km^{2})
- Discharge
  - location: Oil Creek
  - average: 151.2 cu ft/s (4.28 m^{3}/s) at mouth with Oil Creek

Basin features
- Progression: Oil Creek → Allegheny River → Ohio River → Mississippi River → Gulf of Mexico
- River system: Allegheny River (Oil Creek)
- Population: 1,234 (2010)
- Tributaries
  - left: Gilson Run; Golby Run
  - right: Campbell Creek; Dunham Run; Caldwell Creek; Henderson Run
- Bridges: Enterprise Road (PA 27), Duncan Road

Pine Creek is a 13.8-mile (22.1 km) long tributary to Oil Creek in Crawford County, Pennsylvania. Most of Pine Creek and its tributaries are classed as Exceptional Value (EV) or High-quality-Cold Water Fishery (HQ-CWF). Only the lowest part of Pine Creek near Oil Creek is classed as a cold-water fishery.

== Variant names ==
According to the Geographic Names Information System, it has also been known historically as:

- East Branch Oil Creek
- Pine Run

== Course ==
Pine Creek rises on the Caldwell and Tidioute Creek divide near Excelsior Corners, Pennsylvania in Warren County. Pine Creek then flows southwest to meet Oil Creek just southeast of Titusville in Crawford County.

== Watershed ==
Pine Creek drains 85.7 square miles (222 km^{2}) of area, receives about 44.8 in/year of precipitation, has a topographic wetness index of 426.68, and has an average water temperature of 7.35 °C. The watershed is 79% forested.

== See also ==
- List of rivers of Pennsylvania

== Additional Maps ==
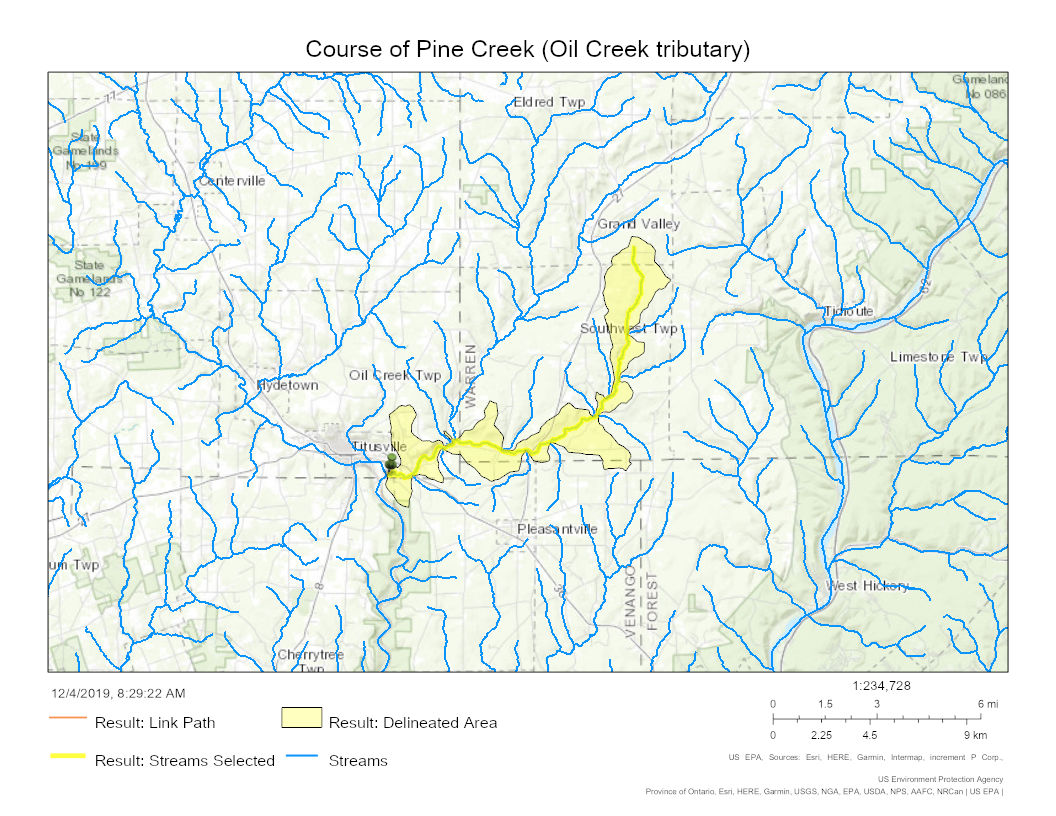
Course of Pine Creek (Oil Creek tributary)

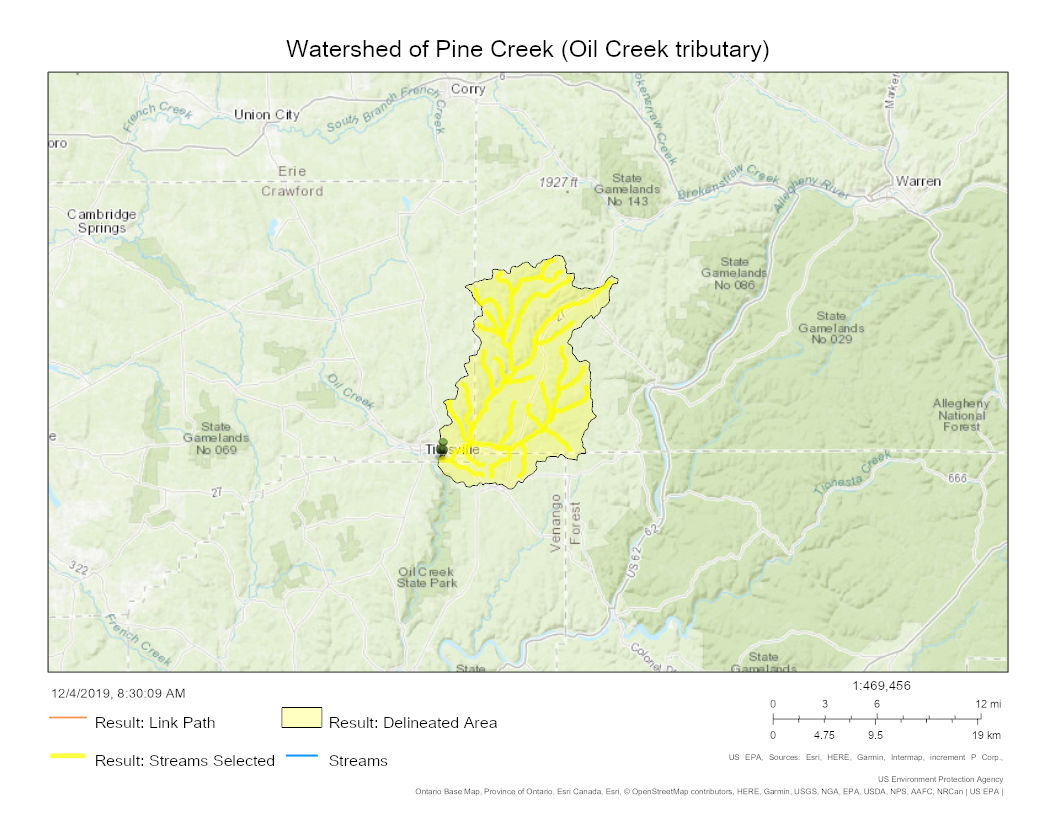
Watershed of Pine Creek (Oil Creek tributary)
