= Turtle Creek (Susquehanna River tributary) =

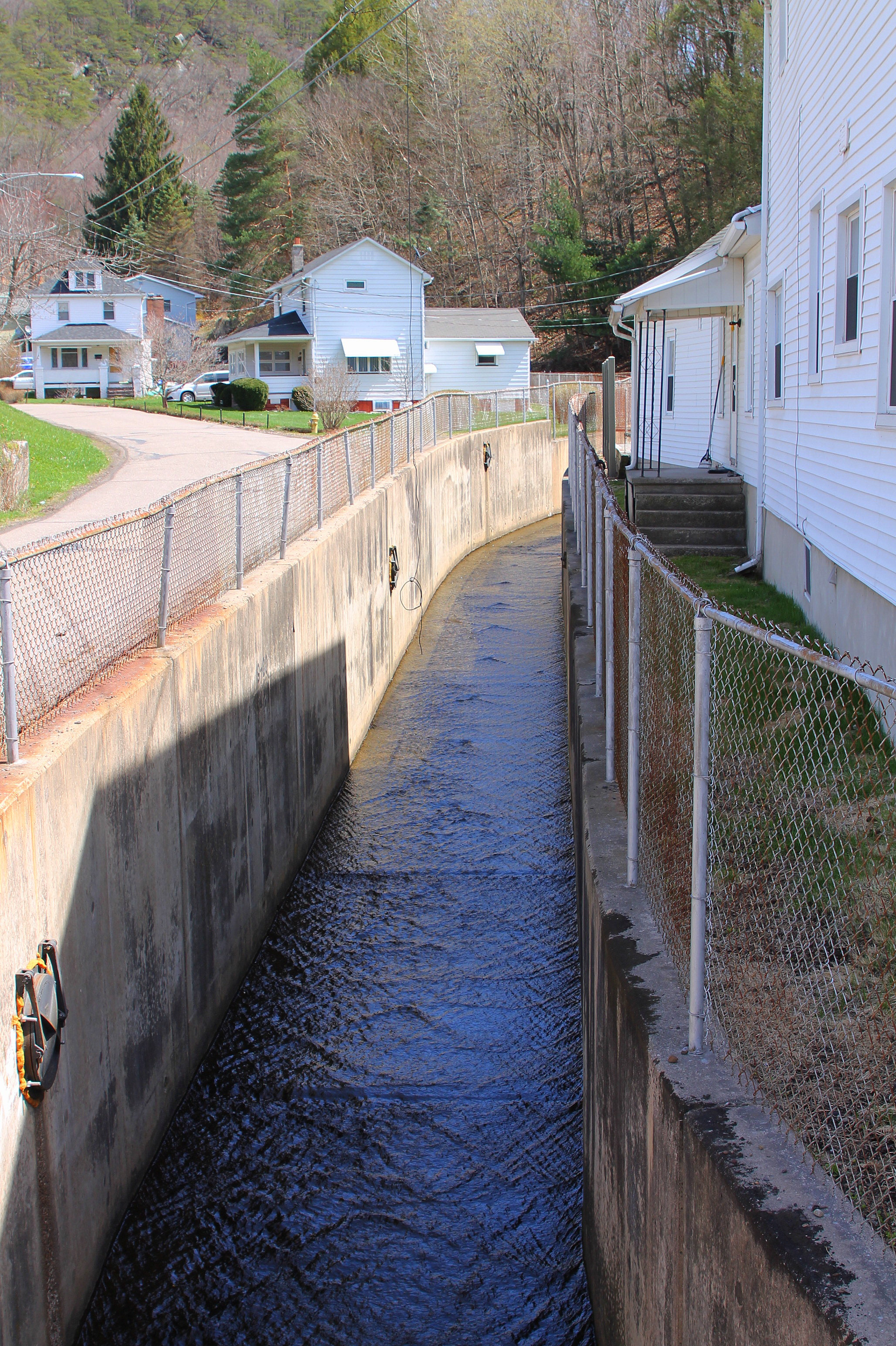
- Turtle Creek looking upstream in Mocanaqua

Physical characteristics
- Source
  - location: valley near Lee Road in Conyngham Township, Luzerne County, Pennsylvania
  - elevation: between 860 and 880 feet (260 and 270 m)
- Mouth
  - location: Susquehanna River in Mocanaqua in Conyngham Township, Luzerne County, Pennsylvania
  - coordinates: 41°08′33″N 76°08′40″W
  - elevation: 482 ft (147 m)
- Length: 2.5 mi (4.0 km)
- Basin size: 1.59 sq mi (4.1 km^{2})

Basin features
- Progression: Susquehanna River → Chesapeake Bay

Turtle Creek (also known as Turtle Run) is a tributary of the Susquehanna River in Luzerne County, Pennsylvania, in the United States. It is approximately 2.5 miles (4.0 km) long and flows through Conyngham Township. The watershed of the creek has an area of 1.59 square miles (4.1 km^{2}). Wisconsinan Bouldery Till, Wisconsinan Ice-Contact Stratified Drift, Wisconsinan Outwash, alluvium, alluvial terrace, fill, and coal dumps all occur in the vicinity of the creek. The creek has been the subject of a flood protection project. Its watershed is designated as a Coldwater Fishery and a Migratory Fishery.

== Course ==
Turtle Creek begins in a valley near Lee Road in Conyngham Township. It flows west-southwest for approximately a mile and a half (2.5 kilometers) alongside Lee Road before passing through a pond or small lake and enters Mocanaqua. In Mocanaqua, the creek continues flowing west-southwest for a few tenths of a mile before turning northwest. After a few tenths of a mile, it turns west-southwest again and after a few tenths of a mile, reaches its confluence with the Susquehanna River.

Turtle Creek joins the Susquehanna River 171.70 miles (276.32 km) upriver of its mouth.

== Hydrology ==
Turtle creek is a perennial stream.

== Geography and geology ==
The elevation near the mouth of Turtle Creek is 482 feet (147 m) above sea level. The elevation of the creek's source is between 860 and 880 feet (260 and 270 m) above sea level.

The surficial geology in the vicinity of the upper reaches of Turtle Creek mostly features bedrock consisting of sandstone and shale. However, some patches of Wisconsinan Bouldery Till, a glacial or resedimented till containing numerous boulders, occurs in the creek's valley. Large areas of strip mining land occur to the north of its valley. In its lower reaches, the surficial geology of the creek mostly features Wisconsinan Bouldery Till and Wisconsinan Ice-Contact Stratified Drift, which contains stratified sand and gravel along with some boulders. Wisconsinan Outwash, alluvium, alluvial terrace, fill, and coal dumps (large piles of coal waste) also occur near the creek's mouth.

The valley of Turtle Creek is a deep and narrow strike valley. During the late Wisconsinan glaciation, basal ice flowed along the valley. Penobscot Mountain is located to the south of the creek.

A bridge carrying Paradise Avenue crosses Turtle Creek in Conyngham Township approximately 400 feet (120 m) northeast of the intersection of Pennsylvania Route 239 and State Route 3004. In 1997, Conyngham Township received a permit to replace the bridge with another structure. The proposed structure contained a 10.9-foot by 4.25-foot aluminum box culvert.

== Watershed ==
The watershed of Turtle Creek has an area of 1.59 square miles (4.1 km^{2}). The mouth of the creek is in the United States Geological Survey quadrangle of Shickshinny. However, the source is in the quadrangle of Nanticoke. The drainage basin is part of the Lower North Branch Susquehanna drainage basin.

== History ==
Turtle Creek was entered into the Geographic Names Information System on August 2, 1979. Its identifier in the Geographic Names Information System 1189974. Turtle Creek, is also known as Turtle Run. This name appears on Patton's Philadelphia and Suburbs Street and Road Map of 1984.

The Pennsylvania Department of Environmental Protection has completed a flood protection project on Turtle Creek. Such a project was considered as early as 1957.

== Biology ==
The entire drainage basin of Turtle Creek is designated as a Coldwater Fishery and a Migratory Fishery.

== See also ==
- Rocky Run (Susquehanna River), next tributary of the Susquehanna River going downriver
- Black Creek (Susquehanna River), next tributary of the Susquehanna River going upriver
- List of rivers of Pennsylvania
