= Black Creek (Susquehanna River tributary) =

River in Pennsylvania, United States of America

- Location of mouth Black Creek (Susquehanna River tributary) (Pennsylvania)

Physical characteristics
- Source
  - location: valley in Conyngham Township, Luzerne County, Pennsylvania
  - elevation: between 840 and 860 feet (260 and 260 m)
- Mouth
  - location: Susquehanna River in Mocanaqua, in Conyngham Township, Luzerne County, Pennsylvania
  - coordinates: 41°08′42″N 76°08′43″W
  - elevation: 482 ft (147 m)
- Length: 2.6 mi (4.2 km)
- Basin size: 3.85 sq mi (10.0 km^{2})
- Discharge
  - average: ephemeral

Basin features
- Progression: Susquehanna River → Chesapeake Bay

Black Creek is a tributary of the Susquehanna River in Luzerne County, Pennsylvania, in the United States. It is approximately 2.6 miles (4.2 km) long and flows through Conyngham Township. The creek's watershed has an area of 3.85 square miles (10.0 km^{2}). It is designated as a Coldwater Fishery and a Migratory Fishery. The creek is ephemeral and loses its flow to underground mines. Varying concentrations of many alkali metals, alkaline earth metals, and transition metals occur in water in the creek's watershed. The watershed typically experiences relatively mild temperatures. It is mainly accessible via U.S. Route 11, Pennsylvania Route 239, and a local road.

Black Creek is situated within the Coal Region of Pennsylvania. Rock formations in the watershed include the Mauch Chunk Formation, the Pottsville Formation, and the Llwellyn Formation. Coal beds in the watershed include the Lower Red Ash bed, the Upper Red Ash bed, the Lower Ross bed, the Upper Ross bed, and the Baltimore Bed. Ridges of mine waste also occur in the creek's drainage basin. Mining was done in the watershed as early as the winter of 1836-1837, but it stopped in 1955. The creek and the surrounding areas were the subject of a joint study by several federal and state organizations in the 1960s.

== Course ==
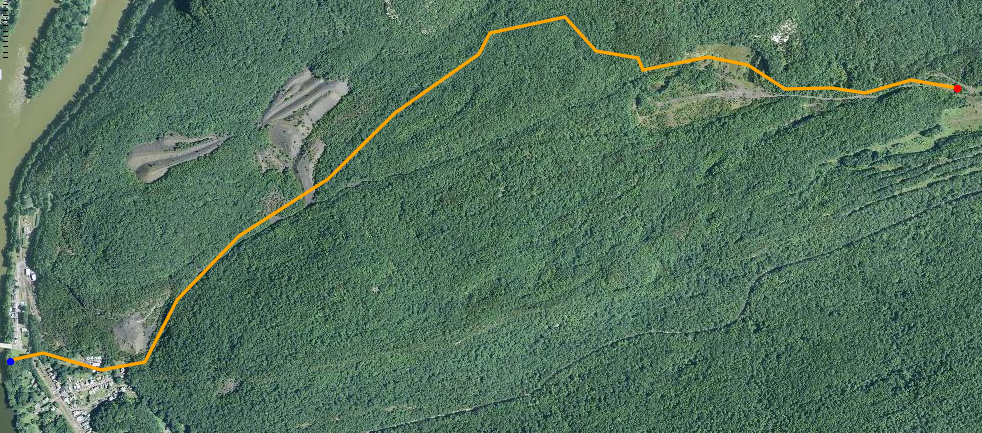
Satellite map of Black Creek

Black Creek begins in a valley in Conyngham Township. It flows west-northwest for nearly a mile, passing through a large pond or small lake, before turning north for several hundred feet. The creek then turns west for a short distance and enters a broader and much shallower valley before receiving an unnamed tributary from the right. It then turns southwest for more than a mile before turning south-southwest and flowing through a deep and narrow valley to the northern border of Mocanaqua. The creek then turns west for a few tenths of a mile, following the border of Mocanaqua to its confluence with the Susquehanna River.

Black Creek joins the Susquehanna River 171.90 miles (276.65 km) upstream of its mouth.

=== Tributaries ===
Black Creek has no officially named tributaries. However, an 1887 book stated that the creek had two tributaries. One was unnamed and flowed from a point 0.5 miles (0.80 km) west of the DuPont Drift to the creek at the Golden Drift. The other was referred to as Turkey Pond Creek and was sometimes nearly dry, but could have a substantial flow during spring rains.

== Hydrology and climate ==
Black Creek is an ephemeral stream. It used to drain an area between Turtle Creek and the Susquehanna River, but now loses its flow to underground mines via broken bedrock. Its channel is also disrupted by strip mines and rock piles. The waters of Black Creek are acidic.

Anions in the waters of the Black Creek drainage basin include sulfate and bicarbonate. The concentrations of aluminum in the mine pools in the area are typically very low or nonexistent. However, some mine waters in the watershed can have aluminum ion concentrations of over 70 milligrams per liter, forming 6 percent of total dissolved solids in the water, as measured by weight. The concentration of manganese ions in the waters can be over 100 milligrams per liter and calcium also occurs in groundwater in the watershed. Magnesium occurs in the non-polluted groundwater in the watershed in concentrations of 1 to 5 milligrams per liter and occurs in polluted groundwater at concentrations of 4 to 440 milligrams per liter.

Sodium and potassium occur in water in the Black Creek watershed, with sodium being considerably more common than potassium. Potassium concentrations are around 20 milligrams per liter, while sodium concentrations are less than 10 milligrams per liter. Lithium and rubidium also have been observed in the watershed, with concentrations of 0.02 to 0.2 and 0.04 milligrams per liter, respectively.

Barium occurs in the water of the Black Creek watershed, typically at concentrations of less than 0.07 milligrams per liter. Beryllium is about as common, with a concentration of less than 0.06 milligrams per liter. Strontium is much more common, with a concentration of up to 4.4 milligrams per liter.

The concentration of titanium in the waters of the Black Creek watershed is less than 0.17 milligrams per liter and the concentration of zirconium is less than 0.055 milligrams per liter. Small amounts (less than 0.01 milligrams per liter) of vanadium, chromium, and molybdenum also occur in the water. The cobalt concentration in mine waters in the watershed ranges from 0.07 to 0.93 milligrams per liter and the nickel concentration ranges from 0.09 to 1.2 milligrams per liter. Copper, silver, tin, and lead also occur in the watershed.

The concentration of chloride ions in the watershed of Black Creek ranges from 0 to 14 milligrams per liter.

A 1971 report described the climate in the watershed of Black Creek as "mild". Temperatures above 100 °F (38 °C) are rare in the area, but temperatures below 32 °F (0 °C) are common. At the United States Weather Bureau station in Wilkes-Barre, the highest recorded temperature between 1945 and 1966 was 101 °F (38 °C) and the lowest was −15 °F (−26 °C). Killing frosts have been recorded as early as October and as late as May.

== Geography ==
The elevation near the mouth of Black Creek is 482 feet (147 m) above sea level. The elevation of the creek's source is between 840 and 860 feet (260 and 260 m) above sea level. The lowest elevations in the watershed are approximately 500 feet (150 m) above sea level and they occur near the Susquehanna River. The highest part of the watershed is a ridge in the northern part of the watershed; this area has an elevation of 1,275 feet (389 m) above sea level. The highest level of topographic relief in the watershed is 775 feet (236 m) and local relief can be as high as 740 feet (230 m), but is typically less than 500 feet (150 m).

The watershed of Black Creek is situated at the southwestern end of the Coal Region. The watershed is also part of a "long, narrow, complexly deformed" synclinorium, with complex folds and faults. The watershed of the creek is within the filled-in valley of the preglacial Susquehanna River. The watershed contains three downwarped coal basins: the West Basin, the East Basin, and the Priscilla Lee Basin. A tunnel runs between the West Basin and the East Basin at an elevation of 567 feet (173 m) above sea level.

There are a number of pits in the area of Black Creek, some of which are up to 100 feet (30 m) deep. Some are former entrances to mines, while others are strip mining pits. There is standing water in the underground mine workings in the creek's vicinity. It drains a coal sheet known as Mine Sheet No. 1. The creek once flowed over a ledge of conglomerate of the Pottsville Formation 2,000 feet (610 m) upstream of its mouth. An 1887 book described this as "producing an effect especially interesting in the study of creek erosion".

Black Creek accumulates drift to some degree as it flows along its course. However, due to the high speed of its waters, it does not deposit significant amounts of drift along its course.

== Geology ==
The bedrock in the watershed of Black Creek consists of several rock formations. The oldest is the Mauch Chunk Formation of the Mississippian and Pennsylvanian eras. Younger rock formations in the watershed include the Pottsville Formation and the Llwellyn Formation, both of which date to the Pennsylvanian era. There are anthracite beds in the watershed and these beds occur within the Llwellyn Formation. The Mauch Chunk Formation was originally 1,200 feet (370 m) thick in the watershed.

Most of the surficial geology in the watershed of Black Creek consists of bedrock. However, glaciofluvial deposits and mining waste also occur in some areas. To the west of the Lee Shaft, there are ridges of mine waste up to 70 feet (21 m) thick and there are a number of "finger-shaped" ridges with a thickness of 120 feet (37 m) in the West Basin.

There are five beds of coal that have been mined in the watershed of Black Creek: the Lower Red Ash bed, the Upper Red Ash bed, the Lower Ross bed, the Upper Ross bed, and the Baltimore Bed. The Lower Red Ash coal bed has a thickness of up to 14 feet (4.3 m) at the West End Mine in the watershed and the Upper Red Ash coal is up to 12 feet (3.7 m) thick.

The bedrock is exposed on the ridges in the Black Creek watershed. The exposure is due to glaciofluvial deposits disappearing due to erosion and mining. There are many faults in the watershed's rocks.

== Watershed ==
The watershed of Black Creek has an area of 3.85 square miles (10.0 km^{2}). The mouth of the creek is in the United States Geological Survey quadrangle of Shickshinny. However, its source is in the quadrangle of Nanticoke.

The Susquehanna River watershed is immediately north and west of the watershed of Black Creek, while the watershed of Turtle Creek is located immediately south of the watershed. The eastern edge of the watershed (the part that was studied during the 1960s study of the watershed) includes a barrier pillar between the West End Mine and the Glen Lyon Mine. A body of water known as Stump Lake is in the creek's watershed.

As of the 1960s or early 1970s, the only human inhabitants of the watershed of Black Creek reside either in the village of Mocanaqua in the southwestern part of the watershed or the small community of Lee. The watershed can be accessed from US Route 11, Pennsylvania Route 239, and a local road that runs from Mocanaqua to Glen Lyon.

Historically, there was a swamp at the headwaters of Black Creek. As late as the 1910s, the waters of the creek were described as coming from mountain springs and a swamp.

== History ==
Black Creek was entered into the Geographic Names Information System on August 2, 1979. Its identifier in the Geographic Names Information System is 1169696.

Coal mining was done in the watershed of Black Creek as early as the winter of 1836–1837. Several people operated in the area until 1865, when it was leased to the E.I. du Pont de Nemours & Company for 99 years. However, the mining was stopped by a strike in 1872 and for some time thereafter mining was done by several smaller companies. The mine in the watershed was run by the Delaware, Lackawanna, and Western Railroad between 1901 and 1921. The Glen Alden Corp. then operated it until 1938, at which point underground mining in the watershed stopped. Strip mining was already underway there and it continued until 1955, when all mining stopped. During World War II, coal waste in the watershed was rerun through a coal processing plant to recover coal. In 1971, the land was owned by the Blue Coal Company. A total of 22 million tons of coal have been mined in the area.

In the early 1900s, mine water and culm were discharged into Black Creek.

Between 1965 and 1967, the Federal Water Pollution Control Administration, the United States Bureau of Mines, the United States Bureau of Sport Fisheries and Wildlife, the United States Geological Survey, and the Pennsylvania Department of Mines and Mineral Industries conducted a joint study on the watershed of Black Creek. The purpose of the study was to deal with water pollution due to acid mine drainage. Geological field work was carried out in the area between October 1965 and December 1965. Core and rock cuttings were done between October 1966 and June 1967. However, this study was ended before all of the necessary scientific investigations were completed.

== Biology ==
The entire drainage basin of Black Creek is designated as a Coldwater Fishery and a Migratory Fishery.

== See also ==
- Turtle Creek (Susquehanna River), next tributary of the Susquehanna River going downriver
- Paddy Run, next tributary of the Susquehanna River going upriver
- List of rivers of Pennsylvania

== Works cited ==
- Newport, Thomas G. (1971). Geology, Hydrology, and Geochemistry of the Black Creek Watershed Near Mocanaqua, PA.
