= Conyngham Township, Pennsylvania =

Conyngham Township is the name of some places in the U.S. state of Pennsylvania:

- Conyngham Township, Columbia County, Pennsylvania
- Conyngham Township, Luzerne County, Pennsylvania
