= Paddy Run =

Paddy Run Paddy Run Creek
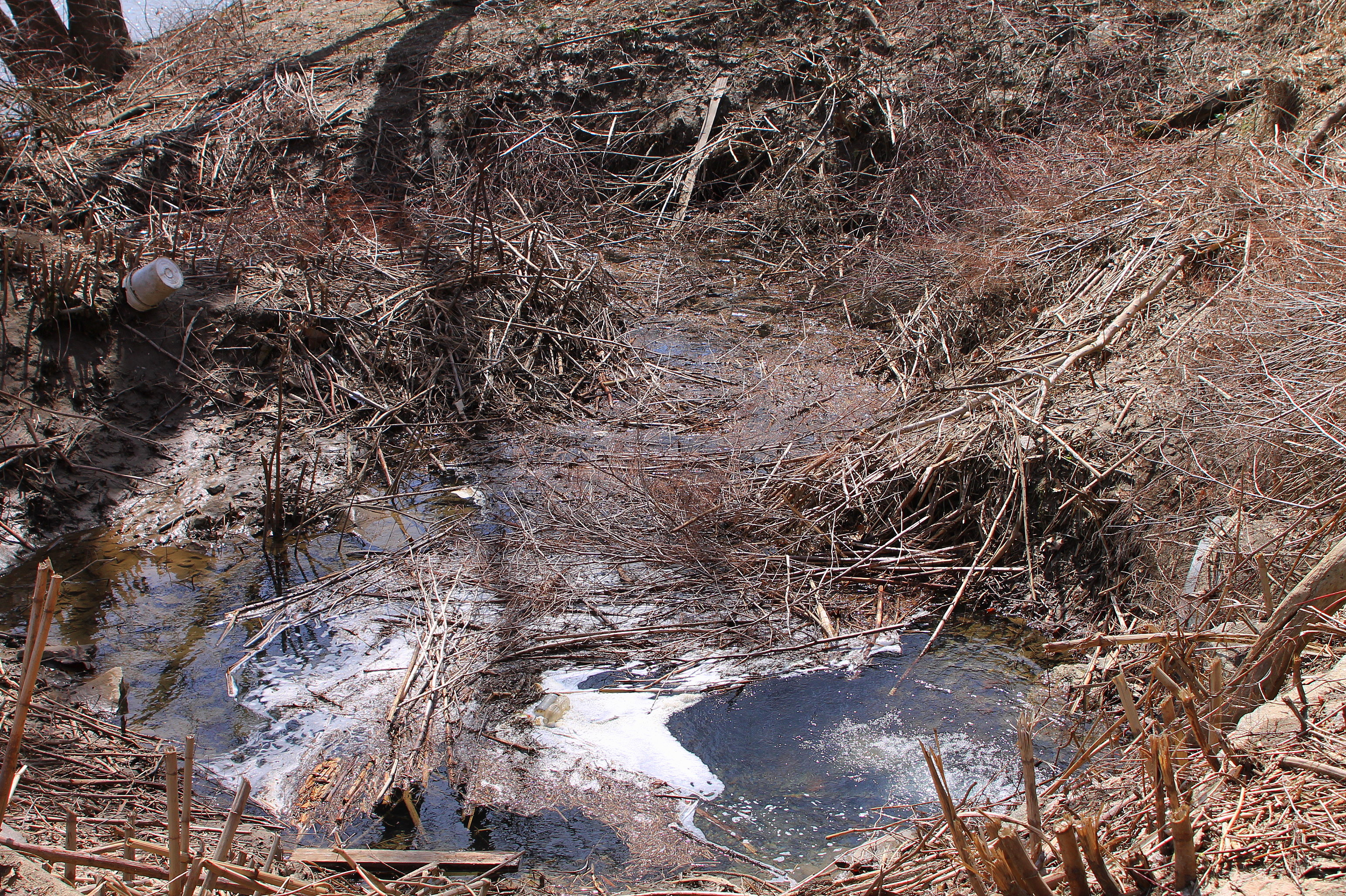
- Paddy Run near its mouth

Physical characteristics
- Source
  - location: Valley in Salem Township, Pennsylvania
  - elevation: between 1,020 and 1,040 feet (310 and 320 m)
- Mouth
  - location: Susquehanna River in Shickshinny
  - coordinates: 41°08′48″N 76°08′52″W
  - elevation: 482 ft (147 m)
- Length: 1.0 mi (1.6 km)

Basin features
- Progression: Susquehanna River → Chesapeake Bay

Paddy Run (also known as Paddy Run Creek) is a tributary of the Susquehanna River in Luzerne County, Pennsylvania. It is approximately 1.0 mile (1.6 km) long and flows through Salem Township and Shickshinny. The stream is in the United States Geological Survey quadrangle of Shickshinny. It has been used as an industrial water supply for the E.E. Stackhouse Coal Company. The stream was entered into the Geographic Names Information System on February 1, 1990.

== Course ==
Paddy Run begins a valley in Salem Township. It flows east for several tenths of a mile before turning east-northeast. After a short distance, the stream exits its valley and enters Shickshinny. It turns east and crosses US Route 11. A short distance further downstream, it reaches its confluence with the Susquehanna River.

== Geography and geology ==
The elevation near the mouth of Paddy Run is 482 feet (147 m) above sea level. The elevation of the stream's source is between 1,020 and 1,040 feet (310 and 320 m) above sea level.

The watershed of Paddy Run is relatively mountainous and is situated on the Salem coal basins. The stream flows down the eastern side of Rocky Mountain.

Paddy Run accumulates drift to some degree as it flows along its course. However, due to the high speed of its waters, it does not deposit significant amounts of drift along its course. One more mine sheets occur in the stream's watershed.

== Watershed ==
Paddy Run is entirely within the United States Geological Survey quadrangle of Shickshinny. The stream is in Pennsylvania State Game Lands Number 260 for most of its length.

== History ==
The Paddy Run Coal Company was established in Shickshinny by John M. Stackhouse and his brother Cyrus Stackhouse in the 19th century. In the late 1800s, the mouth of Paddy Run was on the Pennsylvania Canal at the Salem Coal Breakers. Along with Rocky Run, the stream was used as an industrial water supply for the E.E. Stackhouse Coal Company. The water was supplied via gravity from small reservoirs.

Susquehanna Haul & Drilling, LLC has a permit to reprocess anthracite refuse in Salem Township and Shickshinny, with Paddy Run being the receiving stream for the operation's waste. The permit was granted on April 12, 2012.

== See also ==
- Black Creek (Susquehanna River), next tributary of the Susquehanna River going downriver
- Shickshinny Creek, next tributary of the Susquehanna River going upriver
- List of rivers of Pennsylvania
