= Wapwallopen, Pennsylvania =

Unincorporated community in Pennsylvania, US

- Unincorporated community
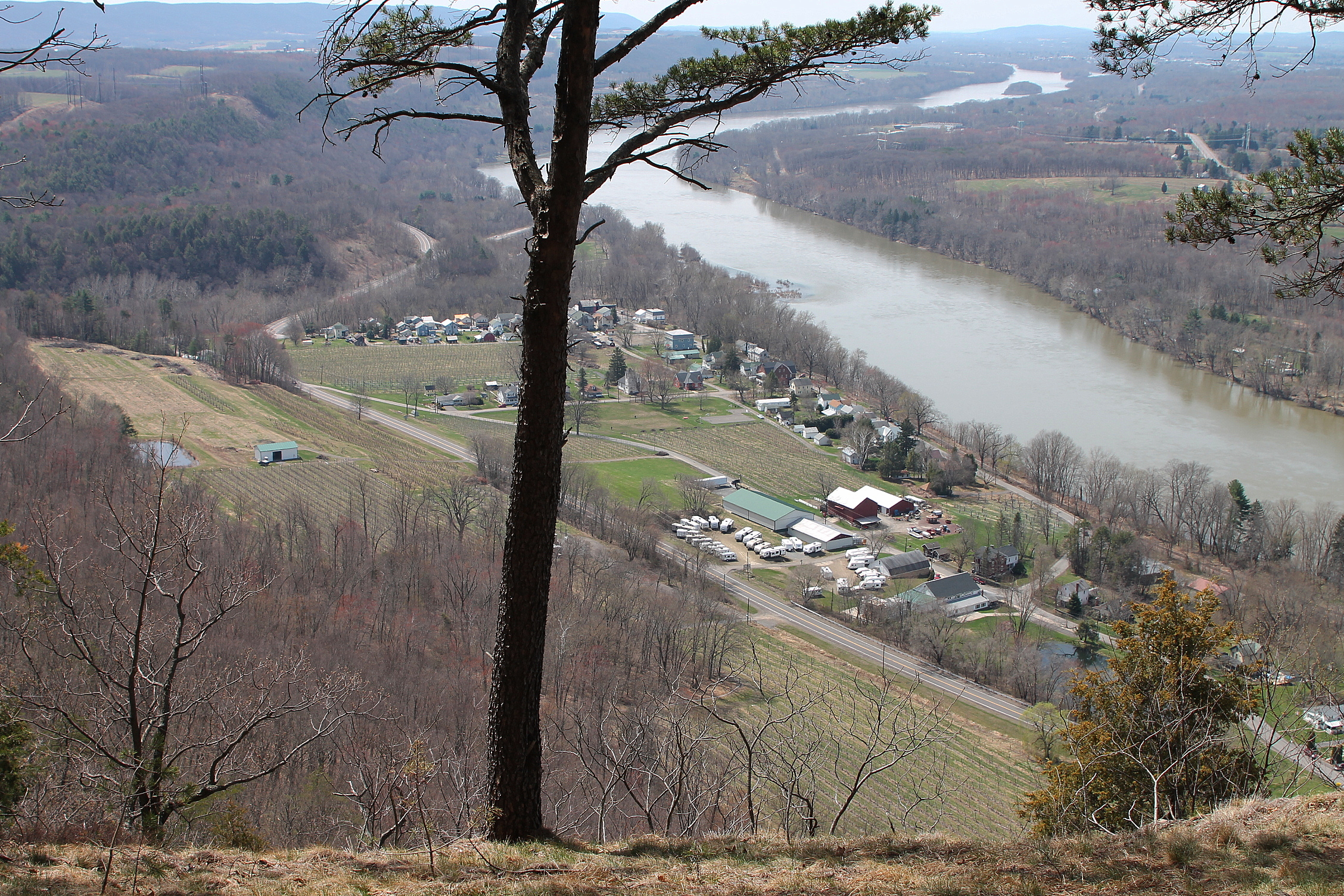
- View of Wapwallopen

- Location in Pennsylvania Location in the United States
- Coordinates: 41°04′28″N 76°7′51″W
- Country: United States
- State: Pennsylvania
- County: Luzerne
- Township: Conyngham
- Elevation: 541 ft (165 m)
- Time zone: Eastern (EST)
  - Summer (DST): EDT
- ZIP code: 18660
- Area code: 570
- GNIS feature ID: 1193606

Wapwallopen is an unincorporated community in Conyngham Township, Luzerne County, Pennsylvania, United States.

It is named for a Lenni Lenape settlement that was established where Big Wapwallopen Creek feeds into the Susquehanna River. The name derives from Lenape òphalahpink 'place of white wild hemp'.

Pennsylvania Route 239 passes through the settlement.

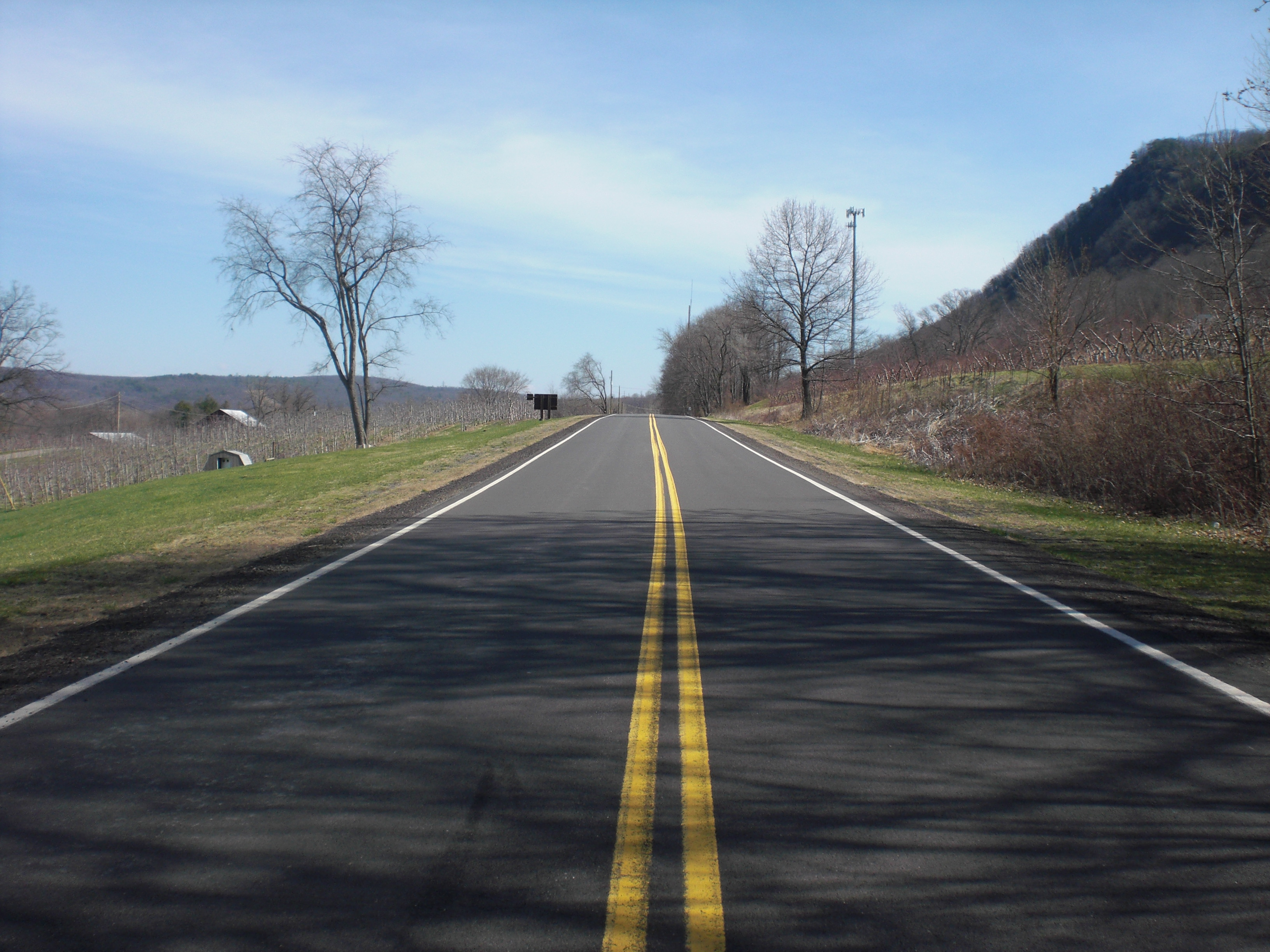
Pennsylvania Route 239 in Wapwallopen
