= Rocky Run (Susquehanna River tributary) =

Physical characteristics
- Source
  - location: deep valley between Lee Mountain and another mountain in Salem Township, Luzerne County, Pennsylvania
  - elevation: between 920 and 940 feet (280 and 290 m)
- Mouth
  - location: Susquehanna River at Dogtown in Salem Township, Luzerne County, Pennsylvania
  - coordinates: 41°08′20″N 76°08′44″W
  - elevation: between 480 and 500 feet (150 and 150 m)
- Length: 2.3 mi (3.7 km)
- Basin size: 1.83 mi^{2} (4.7 km^{2})
- Discharge
  - average: 170,000 US gallons per day (0.26 cu ft/s; 0.0074 m^{3}/s) (in 1909)

Basin features
- Progression: Susquehanna River → Chesapeake Bay

Rocky Run (also known as Rocky Run Creek) is a tributary of the Susquehanna River in Luzerne County, Pennsylvania, in the United States. It is approximately 2.3 miles (3.7 km) long and flows through Salem Township. The watershed of the stream has an area of 1.83 square miles (4.7 km^{2}). In the early 1900s, the stream had a high level of water quality and was proposed for use as a water supply. The construction of a dam on it was proposed, but no formal plans were ever made. There are coal mines in the watershed, but they have been abandoned since the late 1800s. Wisconsinan Till, Wisconsinan Ice-Contact Stratified Drift, Boulder Colluvium, Wisconsinan Bouldery Till, coal dumps, and bedrock consisting of sandstone and shale all occur in the watershed. The drainage basin is designated as a Coldwater Fishery.

== Course ==
Rocky Run begins in a deep valley between Lee Mountain and another mountain in Salem Township. It flows east for several tenths of a mile before turning slightly northeast. After some distance, it loses its flow, but continues eastward. It runs alongside Rocky Run Road for a short distance before crossing US Route 11 and reaching its confluence with the Susquehanna River at the community of Dogtown.

Rocky Run joins the Susquehanna River 171.48 miles (275.97 km) upstream of its mouth.

== Hydrology ==
In 1909, the discharge of Rocky Run was measured by the Pennsylvania Department of Health to be 170,000 gallons per day. The minimum discharge at that time was 90,000 gallons per day.

In the early 1900s, the concentration of total solids in the waters of Rocky Run was measured to be 180 parts per million. The concentration of chlorine was 3.48 parts per million. The calcium sulfate concentration was 19 parts per million, the silica concentration was 8 parts per million, the concentration of magnesium carbonate was 4.5 parts per million, and the concentration of iron oxide and aluminum oxide was 2 parts per million. The concentration of temporary water hardness was 4.7 parts per million and the concentration of permanent water hardness was 11.2 parts per million.

A 1911 report by the Pennsylvania Department of Health stated that waters of Rocky Run were "of excellent quality in every respect".

== Geography and geology ==
The elevation near the mouth of Rocky Run is between 480 and 500 feet (150 and 150 m) above sea level. The elevation of the stream's source is between 920 and 940 feet (280 and 290 m) above sea level.

The valley of Rocky Run is situated to the north of Lee Mountain.

An abandoned anthracite mine is located in the northern part of the watershed of Rocky Run approximately 1.6 miles (2.6 km) upstream of its mouth. A 1911 report mentioned two tunnels leading from the mine and entering loose rocks on a hillside. The report noted that the tunnels had a low discharge and their waters were slightly acidic and stated that during rainy conditions they might drain into Rocky Run.

The watershed of Rocky Run has experienced glaciation. A meltwater sluiceway with a depth of 100 feet (30 m) cuts through the Little Shickshinny-Rocky Run divide between the valleys of Rocky Run and Little Shickshinny Creek.

The surficial geology in the vicinity of Rocky Run mostly consists of a glacial or resedimented till known as Wisconsinan Till. Wisconsinan Ice-Contact Stratified Drift, which contains stratified sand and gravel as well as some boulders, also occurs in the valley, as does alluvium. Boulder Colluvium and Wisconsinan Bouldery Till occur to the north of the stream and Wisconsinan Bouldery Till also occurs in the southeastern part of the watershed. Coal dumps, or large piles of coal waste, occur in some small areas in the watershed. In the watershed's northernmost and southernmost reaches, the surficial geology features bedrock consisting of sandstone and shale.

== Watershed ==
The watershed of Rocky Run has an area of 1.83 square miles (4.7 km^{2}). The stream is entirely within the United States Geological Survey quadrangle of Shickshinny. The stream is 1 mile (1.6 km) downriver of Shickshinny.

A 1911 report described the watershed of Rocky Run as being heavily wooded. The stream was described as flowing "virtually unseen" through a forest in the 1978 Luzerne County Critical Areas Inventory. Part of the stream is in Pennsylvania State Game Lands Number 260. The watershed is in the Wyoming Valley.

== History ==
Rocky Run was entered into the Geographic Names Information System on August 2, 1979. Its identifier in the Geographic Names Information System is 1185367.

In the early 1900s, Rocky Run was considered for use as a water supply for the Insane Hospital and Almshouse in Retreat, Pennsylvania, on the opposite side of the river in Newport Township. The Pennsylvania Department of Health stated that the use of the stream as a water supply would "not be prejudicial to public health". The construction of a dam at a narrow part of the stream's valley approximately 1 mile (1.6 km) upstream of its mouth was proposed. No formal plans were made for the proposed dam, but it was to be 300 feet (91 m) wide, made of earth with a concrete core wall, and to have a capacity of 5,000,000 gallons. The water was to be supplied to the Insane Hospital and Almshouse by means of an 8 or 10 inch pipe with a length of 6.3 miles (10.1 km).

In the 1800s, there were coal mines in the watershed of Rocky Run. The mines were known as the Rocky Run Mines or the Shickshinny Mines. They were opened by Nathan Beach and ownership of them passed to Nathan Beach Crary in 1858. They were also leased to Jesse Beadle for a short time. The mines were abandoned by the 1890s. The stream was historically used along with Paddy Run as an industrial water supply for the E.E. Stackhouse Coal Company.

== Biology ==
The entire drainage basin of Rocky Run is designated as a Coldwater Fishery and a Migratory Fishery.

Hemlock forests surround Rocky Run. A number of very old trees have been discovered along the stream.

== See also ==
- Little Wapwallopen Creek, next tributary of the Susquehanna River going upriver
- Turtle Creek (Susquehanna River), next tributary of the Susquehanna River going downriver
- List of rivers of Pennsylvania
