= Mocanaqua, Pennsylvania =

Unincorporated community in Pennsylvania, US

- Census-designated place
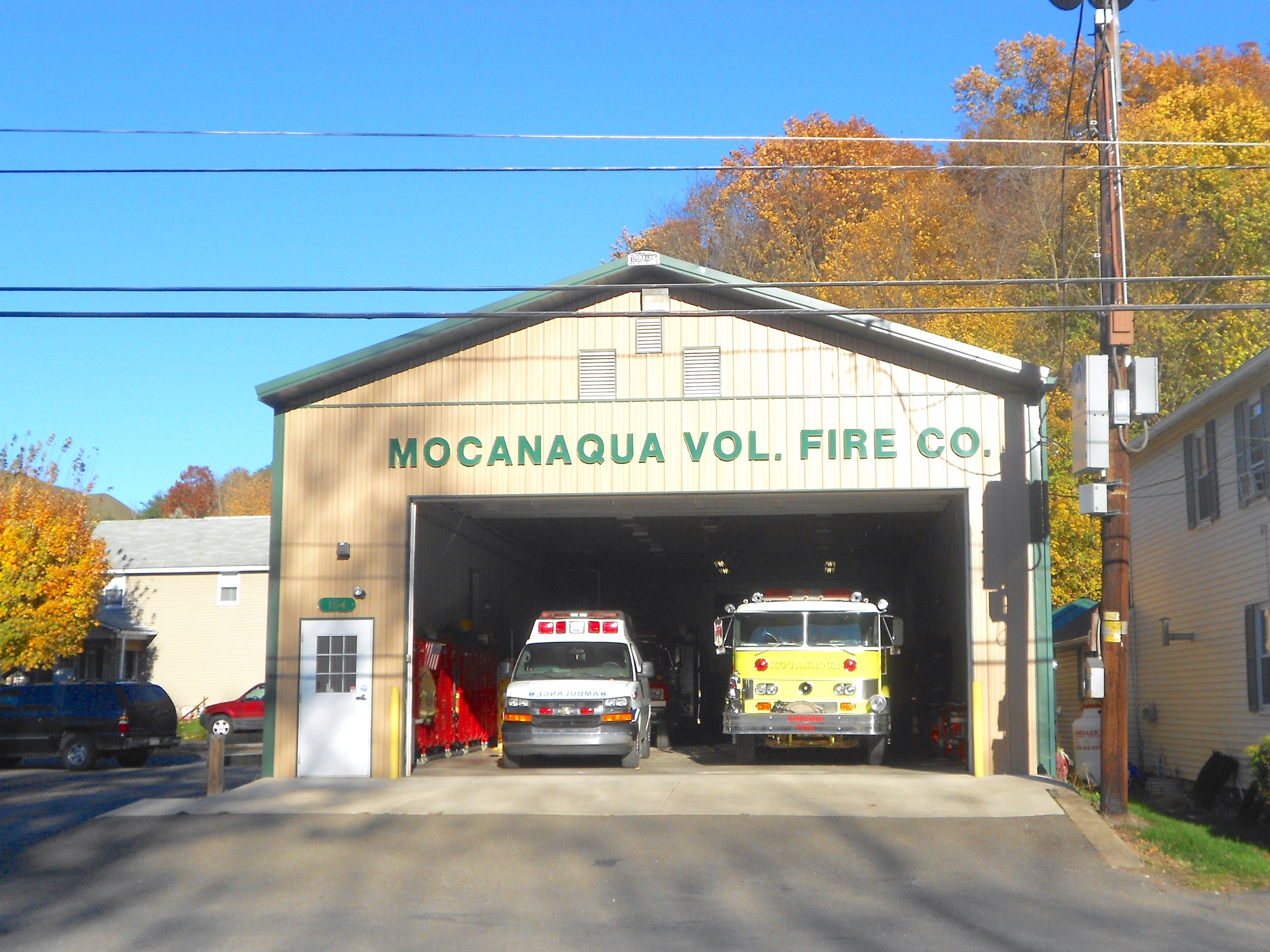
- Volunteer Fire Department
- Nickname: "Little Bear" (Ma-con-na-quah)
- Location in Pennsylvania Location in the United States
- Coordinates: 41°8′28″N 76°8′20″W
- Country: United States
- State: Pennsylvania
- County: Luzerne
- Township: Conyngham

Government
  - Type: 2nd Class Township

Area
  - Total: 0.54 sq mi (1.40 km^{2})
  - Land: 0.49 sq mi (1.28 km^{2})
  - Water: 0.042 sq mi (0.11 km^{2})

Population (2020)
  - Total: 515
  - Density: 1,039.2/sq mi (401.23/km^{2})
- Time zone: UTC-5 (Eastern (EST))
  - Summer (DST): UTC-4 (EDT)
- ZIP code: 18655
- Area code: 570
- FIPS code: 42-50208
- GNIS feature ID: 1181387, 2630027

Mocanaqua is an unincorporated community and census-designated place (CDP) in Conyngham Township, Luzerne County, Pennsylvania, United States. The population was 646 at the 2010 census.

== Geography ==
According to the United States Census Bureau, the CDP has a total area of 0.54 square miles (1.4 km^{2}), of which 0.50 square miles (1.3 km^{2}) is land and 0.04 square miles (0.1 km^{2}), or 9.55%, is water. It is located on the east bank of the Susquehanna River along PA 239, which crosses the river and links Mocanaqua to the borough of Shickshinny.

== Demographics ==
Historical population
Census	Pop.	Note	%±
2020	515		—
U.S. Decennial Census

== Education ==
Students attend the Greater Nanticoke Area School District.

== Gallery ==
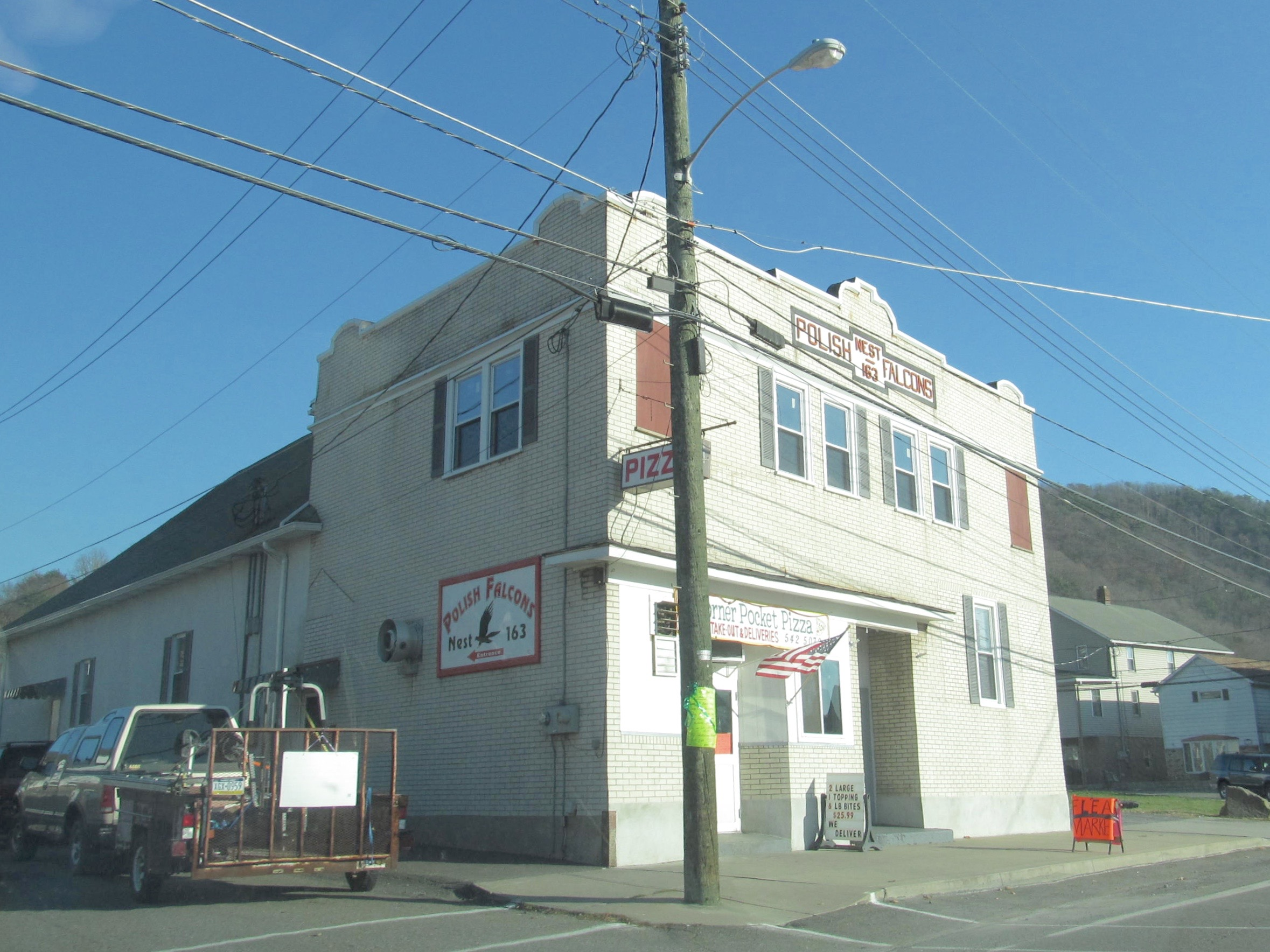
Polish Falcons Hall in Mocanaqua

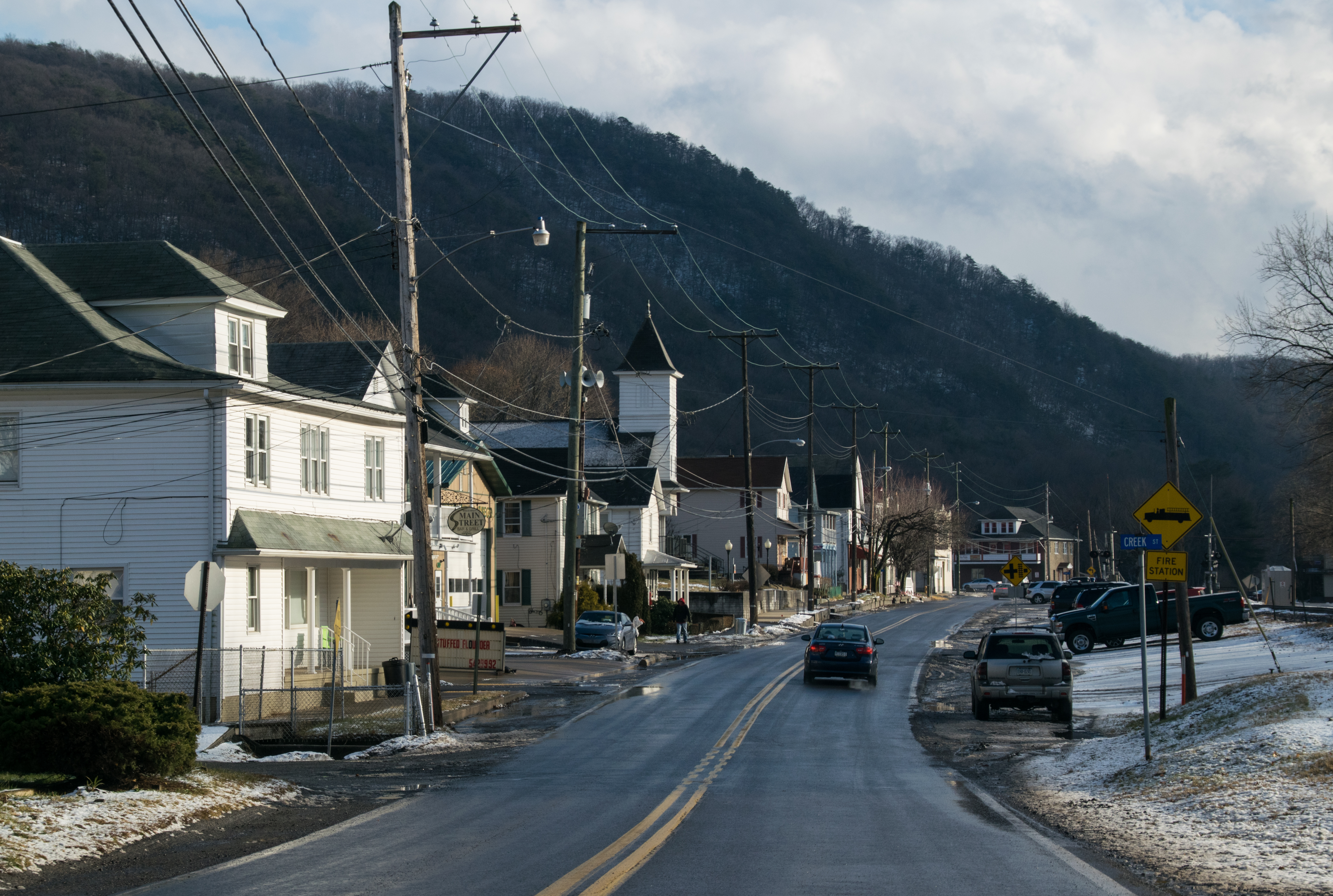
Main Street

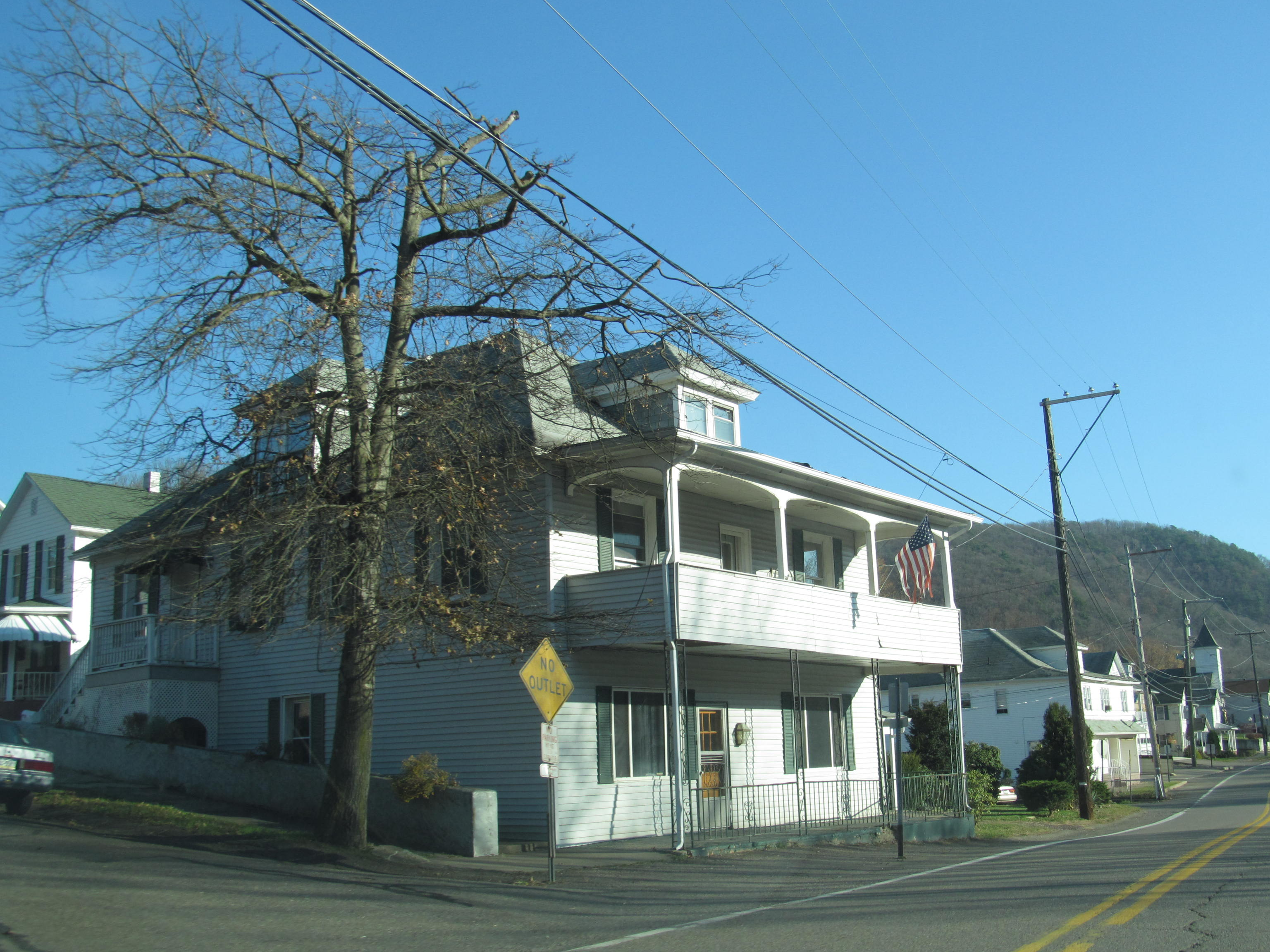
Houses in Mocanaqua

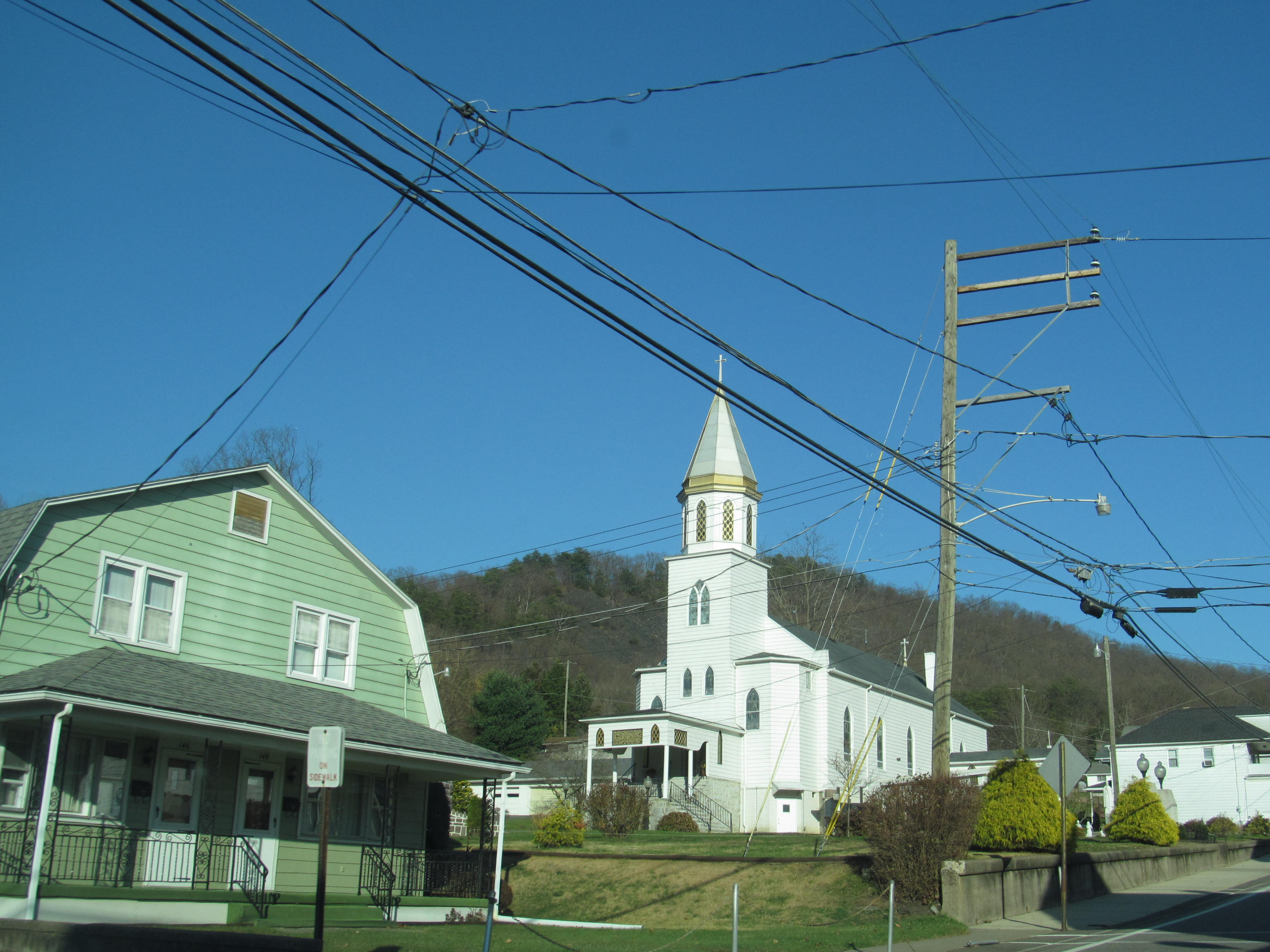
Church in Mocanaqua
