= Conyngham Township, Luzerne County, Pennsylvania =

Township in Pennsylvania, US

Coordinates: 41°08′00″N 76°07′59″W

- Township
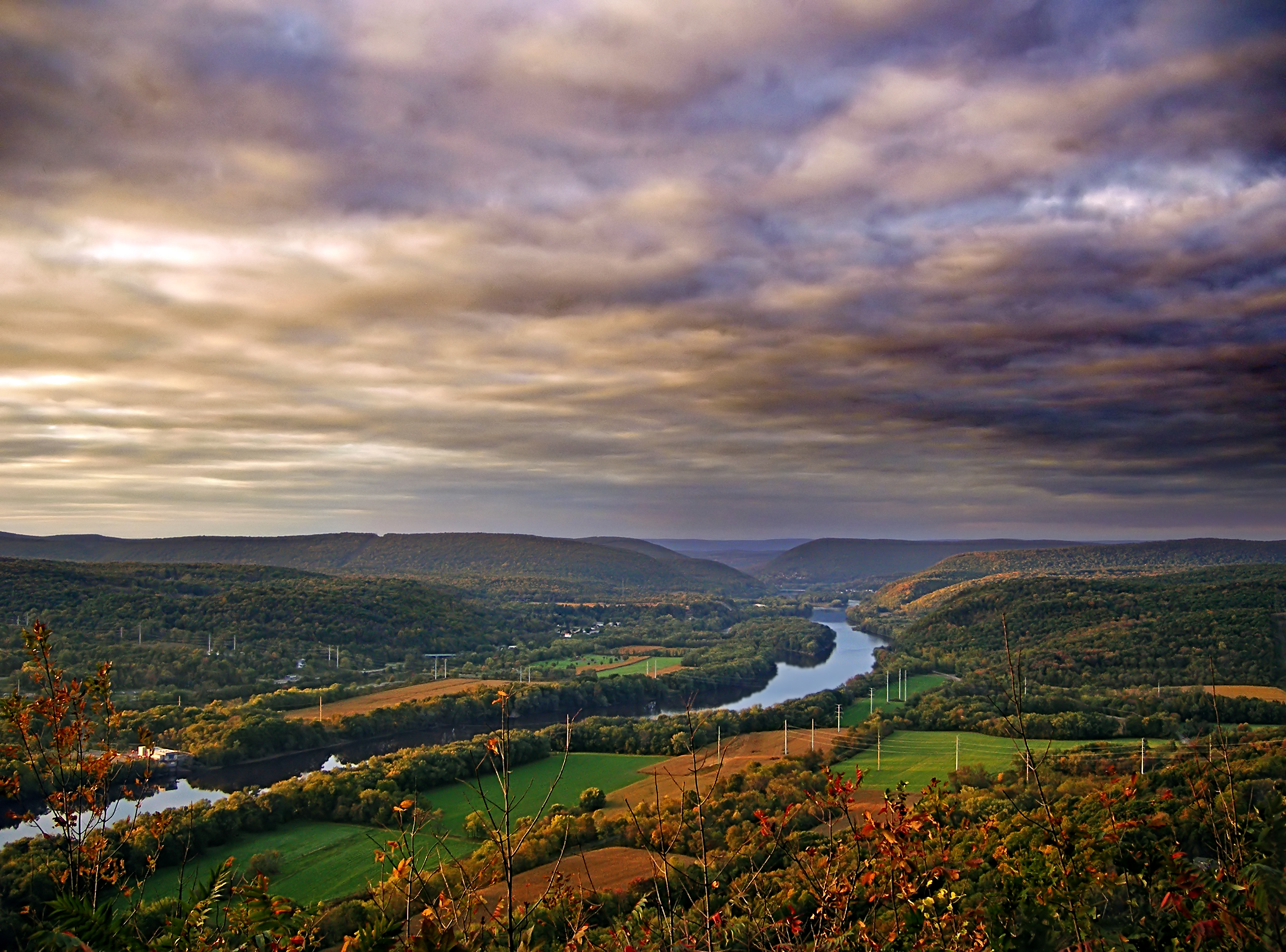
- View of the Susquehanna River from Council Cup Scenic Overlook (in Conyngham and Salem Townships)

- Logo

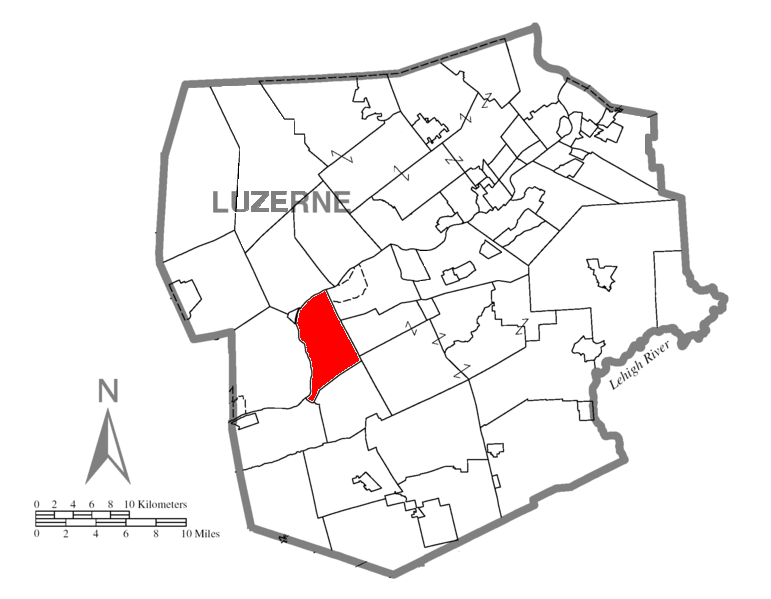
- Map of Luzerne County highlighting Conyngham Township

- Map of Pennsylvania highlighting Luzerne County
- Country: United States
- State: Pennsylvania
- County: Luzerne
- Incorporated: 1875

Area
  - Total: 16.98 sq mi (43.97 km^{2})
  - Land: 16.00 sq mi (41.45 km^{2})
  - Water: 0.97 sq mi (2.52 km^{2})

Population (2020)
  - Total: 1,309 ▼
  - Estimate (2021): 1,312
  - Density: 89.2/sq mi (34.45/km^{2})
- Time zone: UTC-5 (Eastern (EST))
  - Summer (DST): UTC-4 (EDT)
- FIPS code: 42-079-15904
- Website: conytwpluzernepa.gov

Conyngham Township is a township in Luzerne County, Pennsylvania, United States. The population was 1,309 at the 2020 census.

== History ==
Conyngham Township was formed in 1875 (after breaking away from Hollenback Township). The first settler was Martin Harter (who came in 1795). His immediate followers were James McNeil, James Santee, Philip Fenstermacher, John Andreas, Michael Weiss, John Fenstermacher, and Jeremiah Hess. These individuals, who were mostly of German descent, came from Northampton County. In 1804, the first white child was born in the township. His name was John Fenstermacher Jr., the grandson of the first settler (Martin Harter).

In 1797, Martin Harter built the first frame house. The first store was opened in 1805 by Philip Fenstermacher. He went on to build the first sawmill in 1811. A schoolhouse was later erected in 1813.

== Geography ==
Conyngham Township hugs the eastern bank of the Susquehanna River. According to the United States Census Bureau, the township has a total area of 17.0 square miles (44.0 km^{2}), of which 16.0 square miles (41.4 km^{2}) is land and 0.97 square miles (2.5 km^{2}), or 5.73%, is water. Mocanaqua is a village in the northern half of Conyngham Township (near Shickshinny Borough). The village of Wapwallopen is located in the southernmost section of the township.

Most of Conyngham Township is rural. It is made up of farmland, dense forests, mountains, streams, and lakes (e.g., Lily Lake in eastern Conyngham Township). The only major highway in the township is PA 239, which runs north to south along the Susquehanna River.

== Demographics ==
Historical population
Census	Pop.	Note	%±
2000	1,385		—
2010	1,453		4.9%
2020	1,309		−9.9%
2021 (est.)	1,312		0.2%

At the 2000 census there were 1,385 people, 600 households, and 385 families in the township. The population density was 87.4 inhabitants per square mile (33.7/km^{2}). There were 691 housing units at an average density of 43.6 units per square mile (16.8 units/km^{2}). The racial makeup of the township was 98.19% White, 0.72% Black or African American, 0.58% Asian American, 0.22% from other races, and 0.29% from two or more races. Hispanic or Latino of any race were 0.79%.

There were 600 households, 24.2% had children under the age of 18 living with them, 50.7% were married couples living together, 8.3% had a female householder with no husband present, and 35.7% were non-families. 30.0% of households were made up of individuals, and 17.0% were one person aged 65 or older. The average household size was 2.31 and the average family size was 2.86.

The age distribution was 19.4% under the age of 18, 7.8% from 18 to 24, 28.2% from 25 to 44, 22.8% from 45 to 64, and 21.9% 65 or older. The median age was 41 years. For every 100 females, there were 99.6 males. For every 100 females age 18 and over, there were 91.9 males.

The median household income was $31,667 and the median family income was $38,681. Males had a median income of $29,688 versus $22,917 for females. The per capita income for the township was $16,946. 10.3% of the population and 6.1% of families were below the poverty line. 11.2% are under the age of 18, and 10.1% of those 65 and older were living below the poverty line.

== Gallery ==
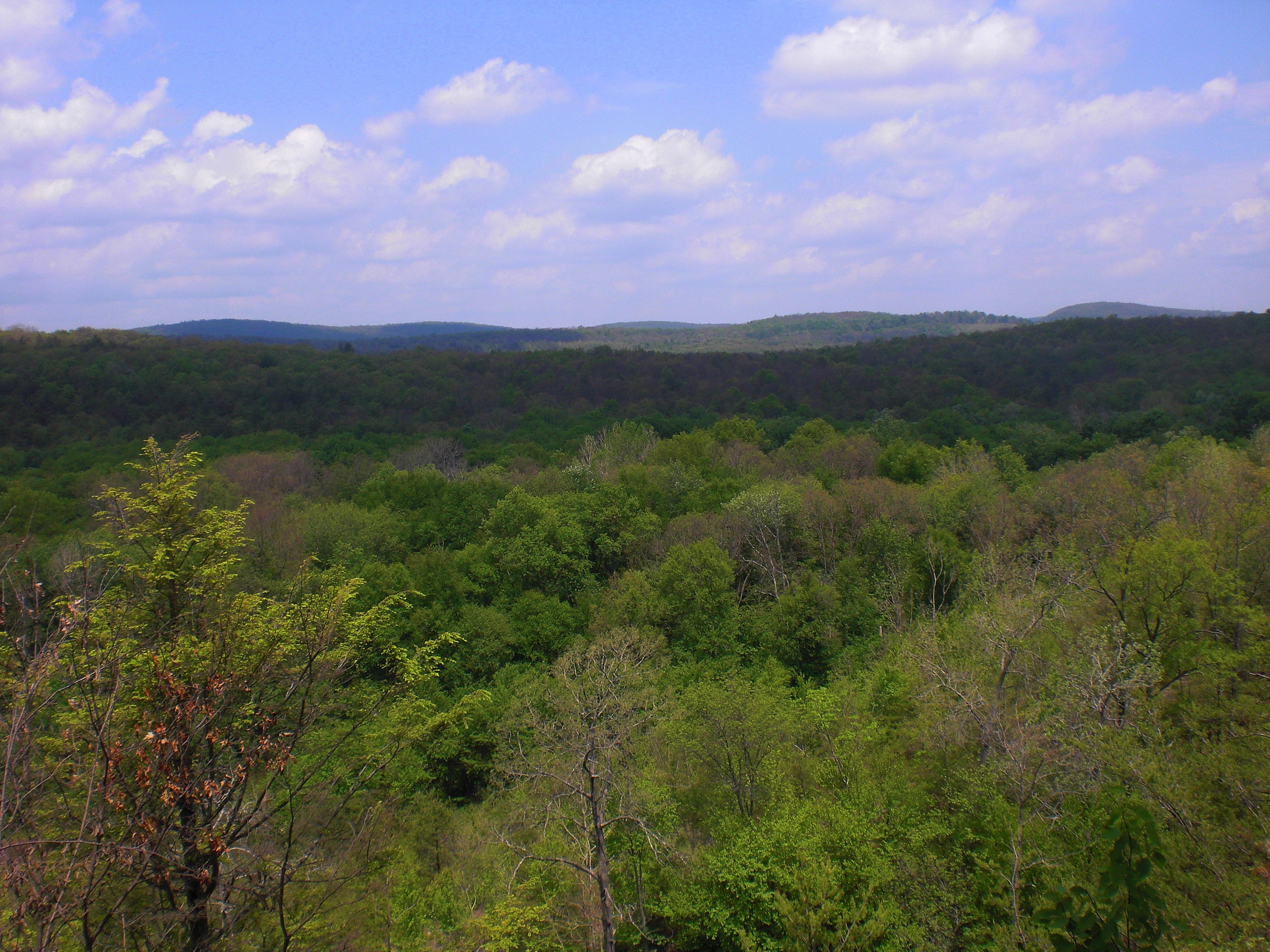
Wilderness in Conyngham Township

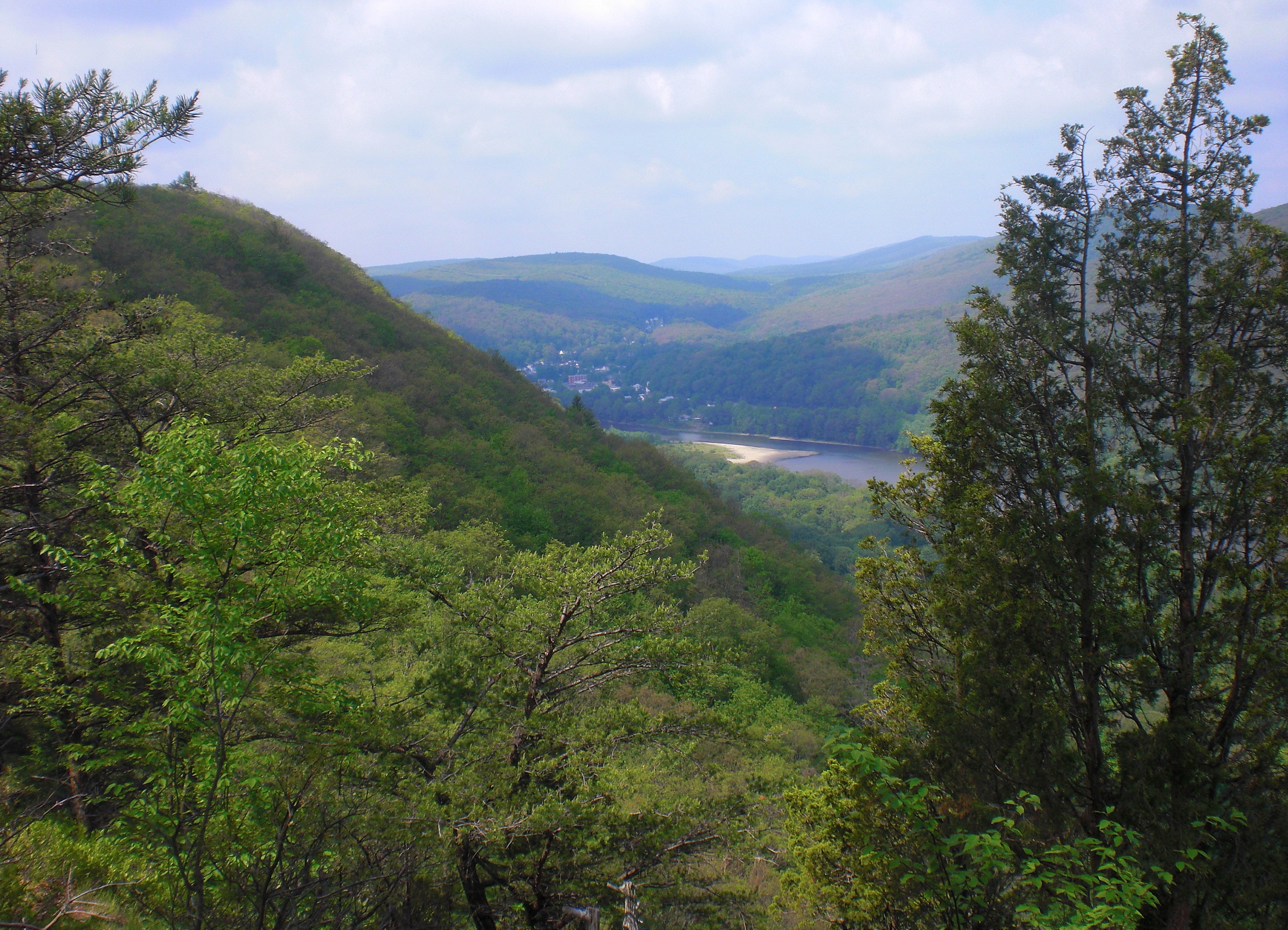
View from the Mocanaqua Loop Trail

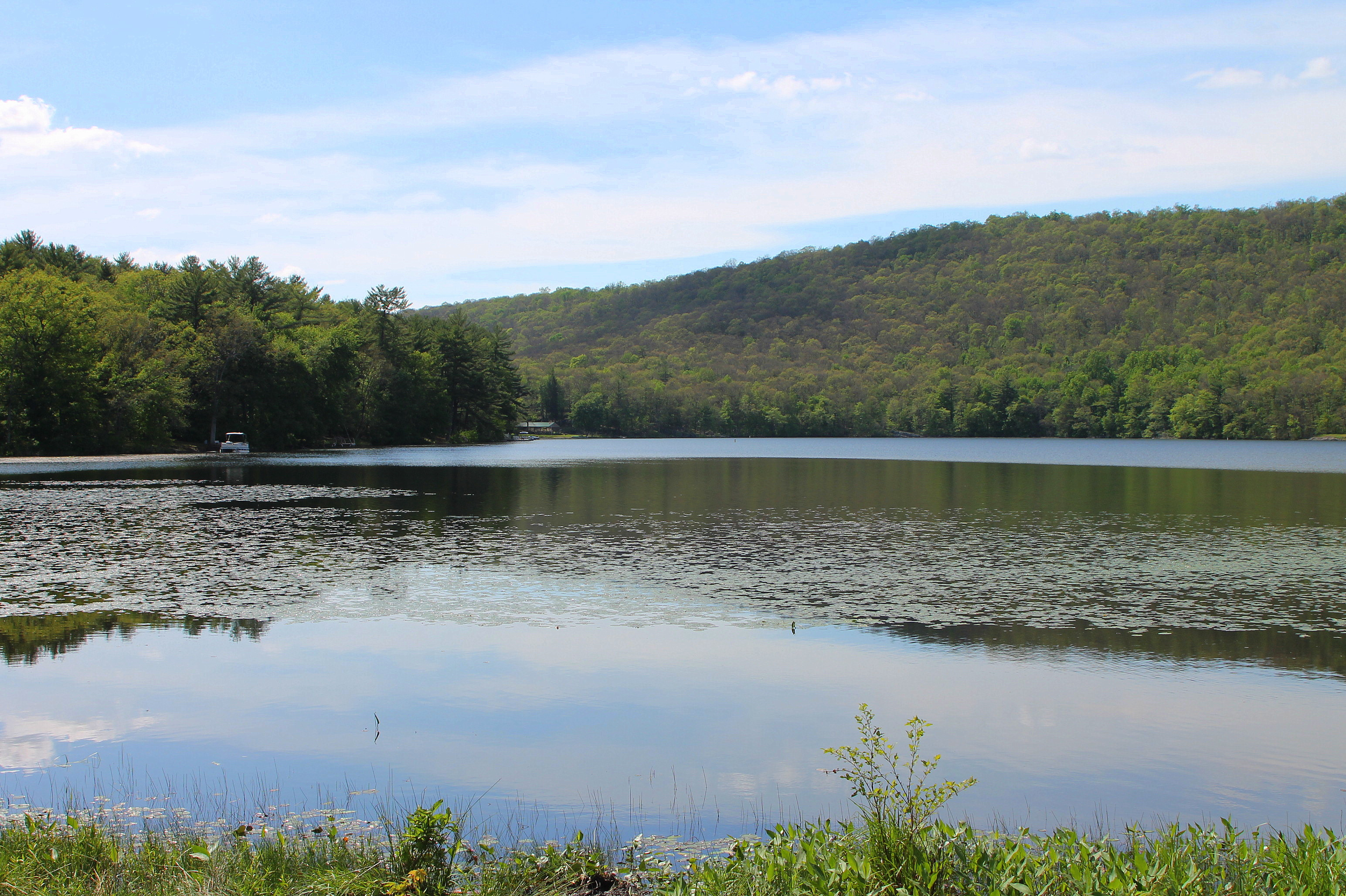
Lily Lake

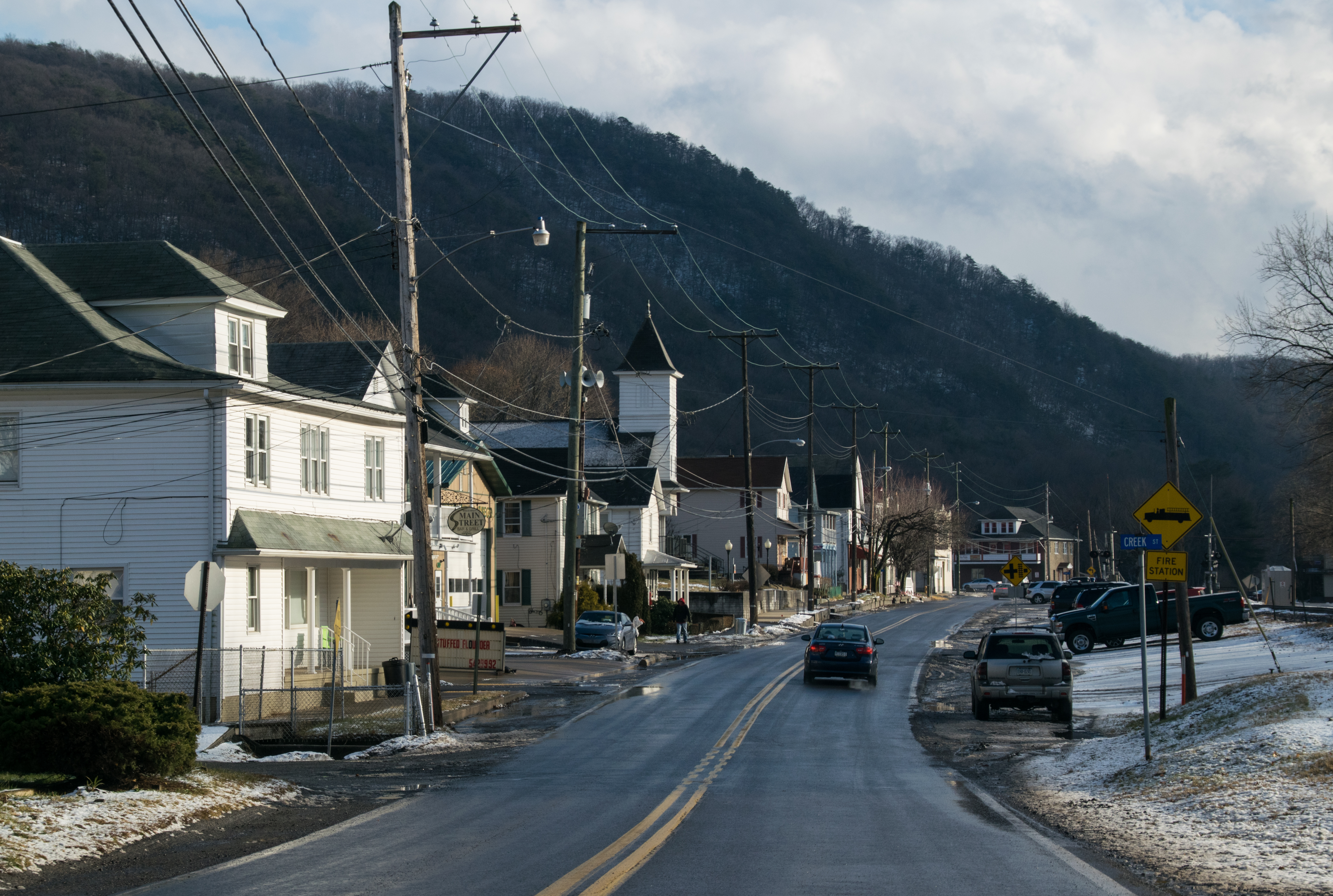
Mocanaqua, Conyngham Township

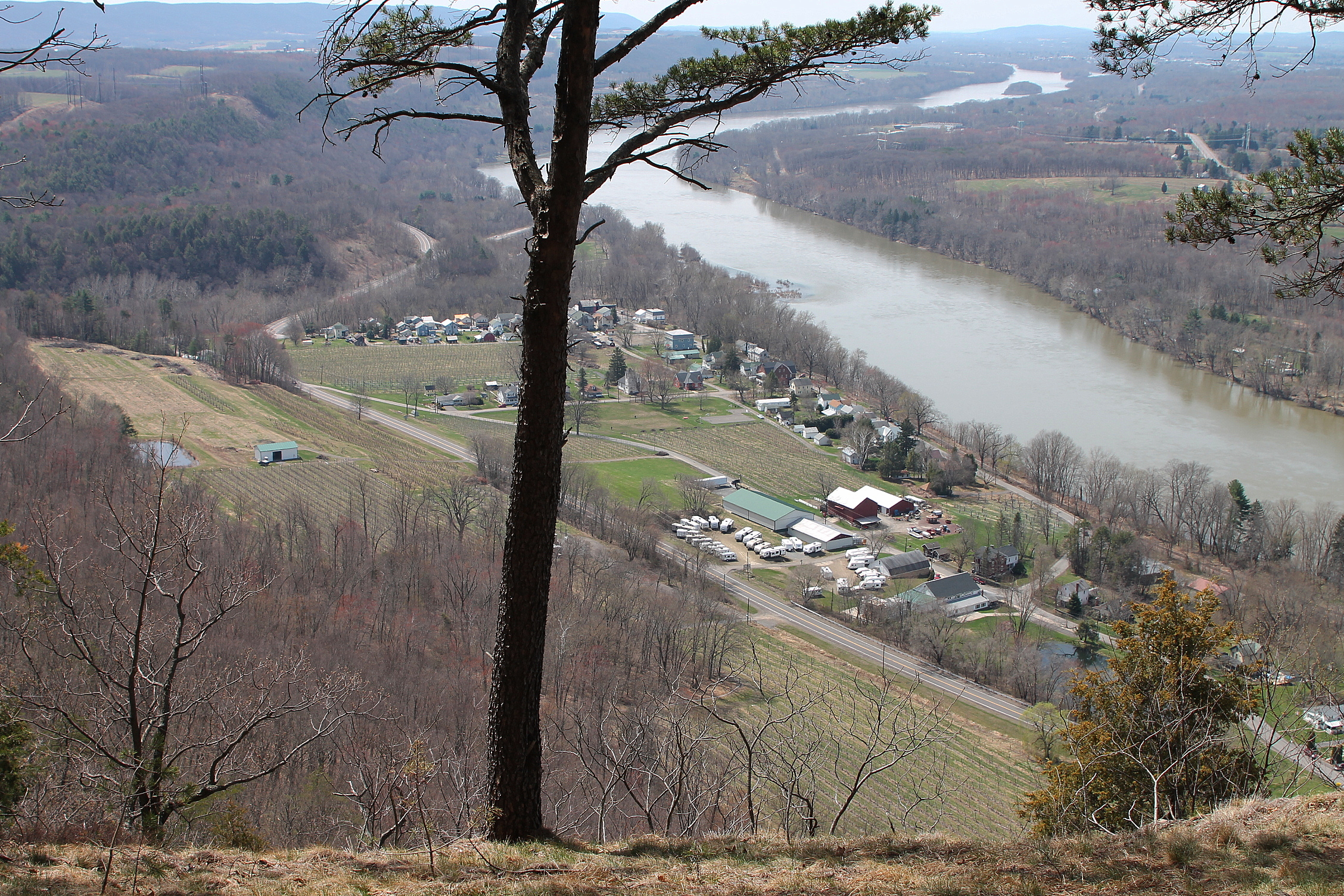
Wapwallopen, Conyngham Township
