= Kise =

Kise may refer to:

- Kise stable, a stable of sumo wrestlers founded in 1958 and closed in 2000
- Kise stable (2003), another sumo stable founded in 2003
- Kise Oyakata, the head coach of the 2003 stable
- Kise, Kentucky

== See also ==
- Kise Mill Bridge Historic District
- Kise Mill Bridge
- Kise Apna Kahein
- Chris Kise, an American attorney
