= Conewago Creek =

Conewago Creek can refer to the following streams in Pennsylvania in the United States. All are in the Chesapeake Bay drainage basin via the Susquehanna River, and are located either east or west of the river.

- Conewago Creek (west) has its source in Adams County and mouth in York County. It has the following tributaries with "Conewago" as part of their name:
  - Little Conewago Creek (west), a tributary in York County
  - South Branch Conewago Creek, a tributary that rises in Carroll County, Maryland, and is also located in Adams and York counties
- Conewago Creek (east) has its source in Lebanon County and mouth in Dauphin and Lancaster counties (it forms the border between them). It has the following tributary with "Conewago" as part of its name:
  - Little Conewago Creek (east), a tributary in Lebanon County

== See also ==
- Conowingo Creek has "Conewago Creek" listed as a variant name in the United States Geological Survey Geographic Names Information System.
