= Bridge between East Manchester and Newberry Townships =

- U.S. National Register of Historic Places
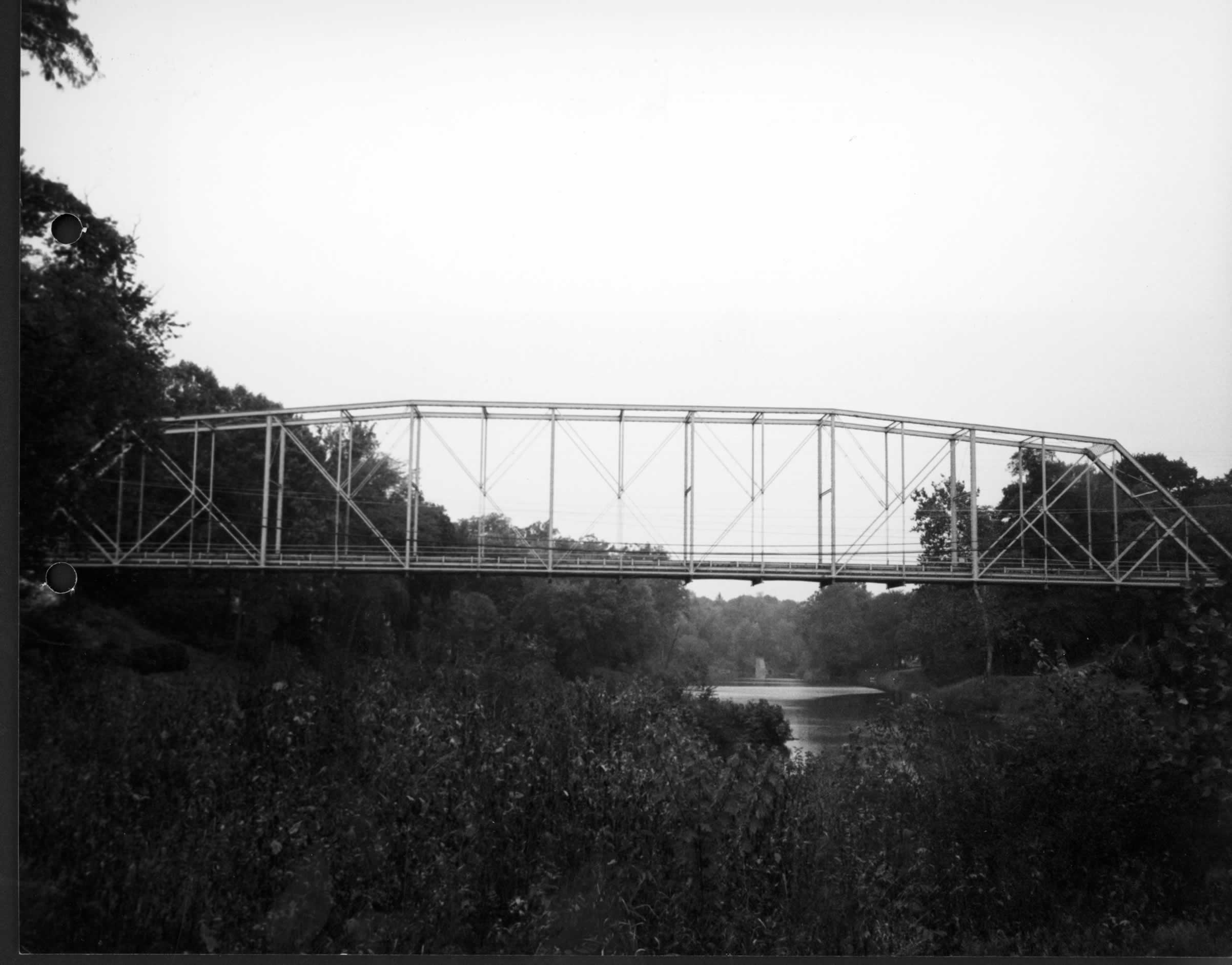
- Bridge between East Manchester and Newberry Townships, 1982

- Location within Pennsylvania Location within the United States
- Location: York-Haven Rd. (State Route 181) over Conewago Creek, East Manchester Township and Newberry Township, Pennsylvania
- Coordinates: 40°4′53″N 76°43′3″W
- Area: less than one acre
- Built: 1889
- Built by: Wrought Iron Bridge Company
- Architectural style: Pennsylvania (Petit) truss
- MPS: Highway Bridges Owned by the Commonwealth of Pennsylvania, Department of Transportation TR
- NRHP reference No.: 88000795
- Added to NRHP: June 22, 1988

Bridge between East Manchester and Newberry Townships is a historic Pennsylvania (Petit) truss bridge spanning Conewago Creek East Manchester Township and Newberry Township, York County, Pennsylvania. The bridge was built in 1889 by the Wrought Iron Bridge Company and measures 299 feet (91 m) in overall length. The bridge was taken out of service about 1985, and is located alongside the new bridge.

It was added to the National Register of Historic Places in 1988.
