= Valley Green (disambiguation) =

Valley Green is a census-designated place in York County, Pennsylvania.

Valley Green may also refer to:

- Valley Green Inn, a historic roadhouse in the valley of the Wissahickon Creek at Philadelphia, Pennsylvania
- Valley Green 6, a building at Apple's Infinite Loop campus

== See also ==
- Green Valley (disambiguation)
