= Hammersly-Strominger House =

Historic house in Pennsylvania, United States

- U.S. National Register of Historic Places
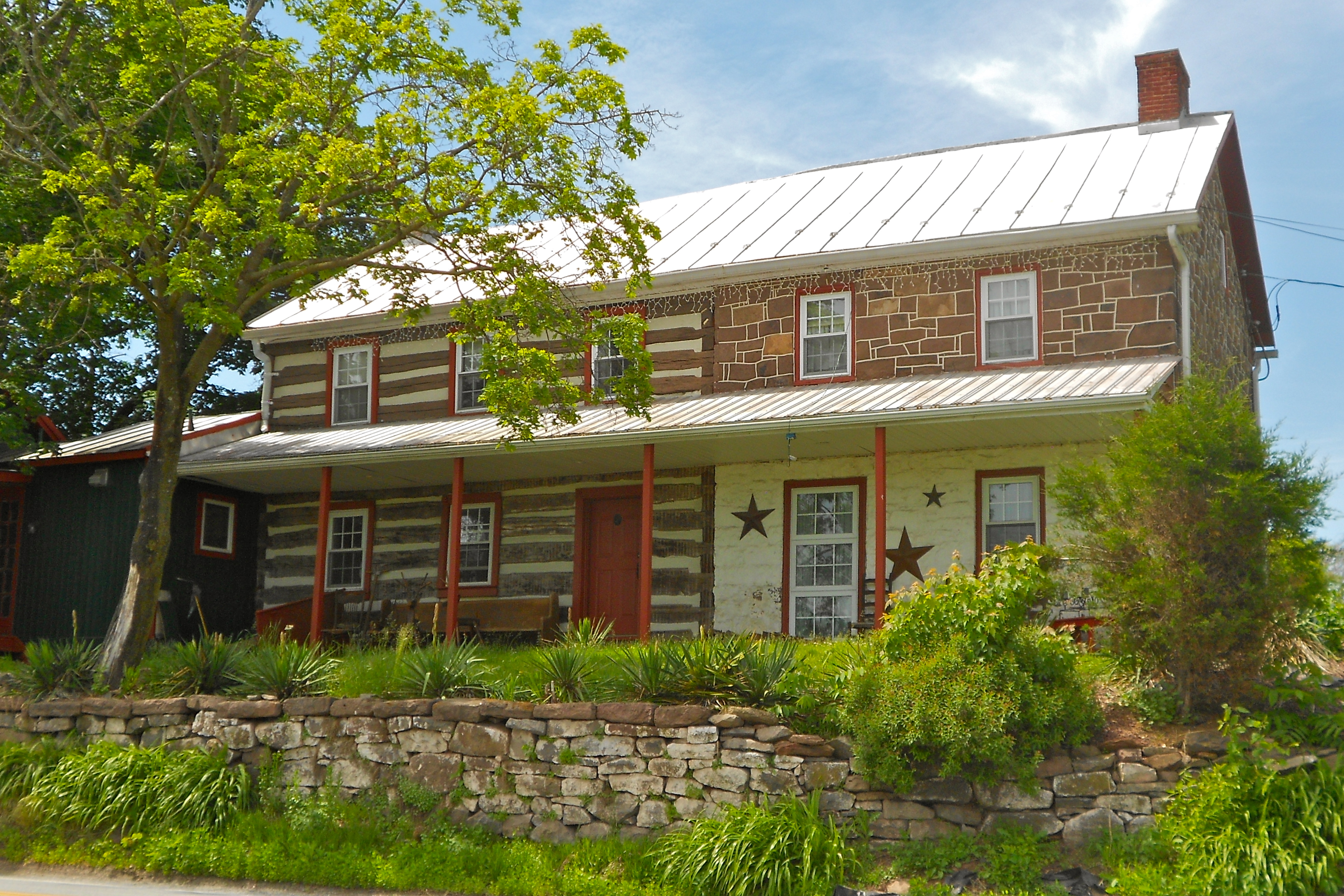

- Location within Pennsylvania Location within the United States
- Location: Northeast of Lewisberry on Pennsylvania Route 177, Newberry Township, Pennsylvania
- Coordinates: 40°8′37″N 76°51′1″W
- Area: 2 acres (0.81 ha)
- Built: c. 1790, 1835
- Built by: Hammersly, Robert; Strominger, Michael
- NRHP reference No.: 78002487
- Added to NRHP: December 20, 1978

Hammersly-Strominger House is a historic home located at Newberry Township, York County, Pennsylvania. It was built in two phases. The first section was built about 1790, and is a 2 1/2-story, log structure with a gable roof. A 2 1/2-story, gable-roofed, stone section was added in 1835. It features a shed-roofed porch.

It was added to the National Register of Historic Places in 1978.
