= Bermudian Creek =

Tributary of Conewago Creek in Pennsylvania

Coordinates: 40.01411°N 77.20918°W

Bermudian Creek is a 24.9-mile-long (40.1 km) tributary of Conewago Creek in Adams and York counties in Pennsylvania in the United States.

Bermudian Creek joins Conewago Creek north of Pickett Hill and just south of Detters Mill.

== Tributaries ==
- Mud Run
- Latimore Creek

== See also ==
- Bridge in Washington Township
- List of rivers of Pennsylvania
