= Henry and Elizabeth Berkheimer Farm =

- U.S. National Register of Historic Places
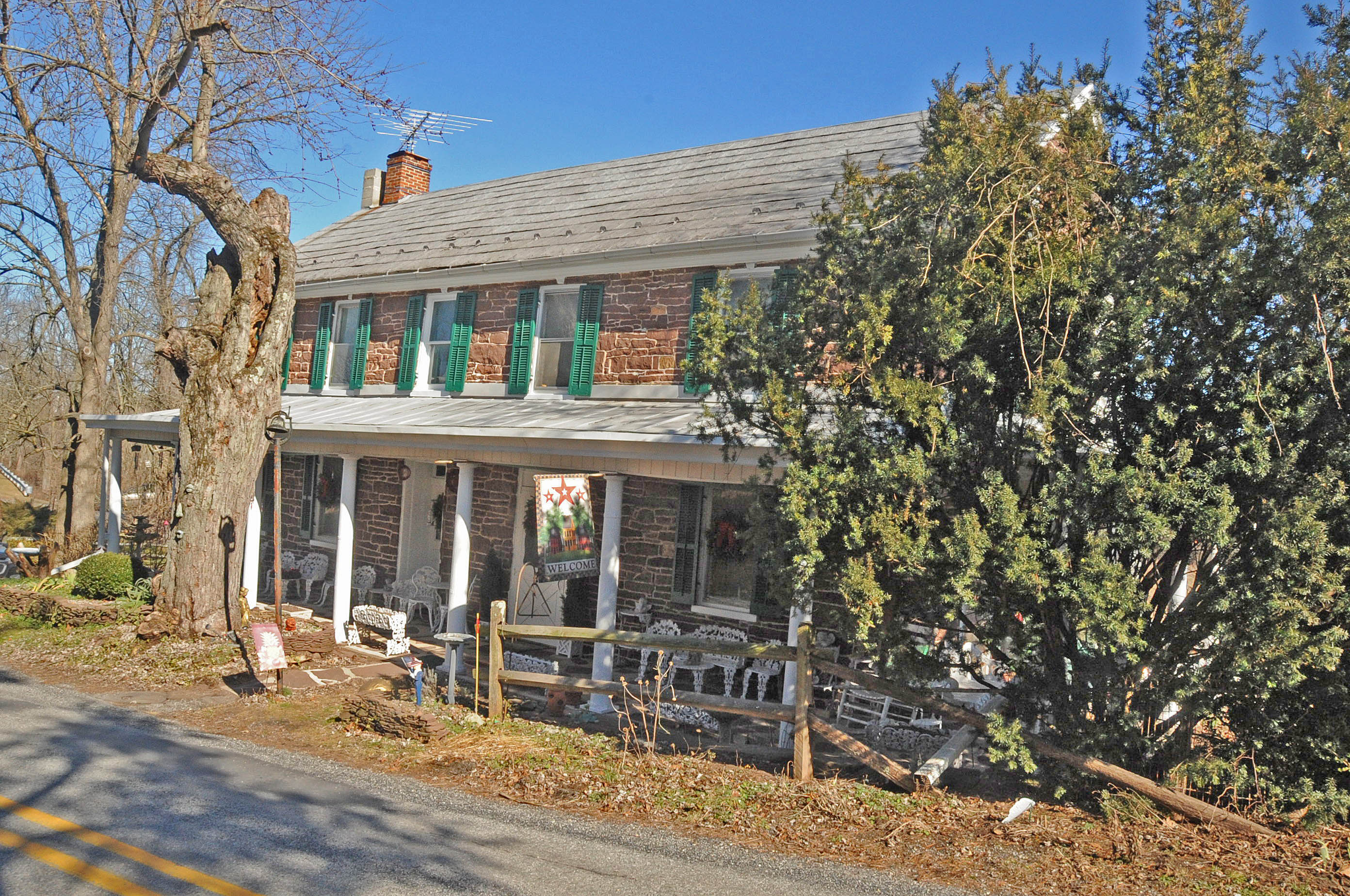

- Location within Pennsylvania Location within the United States
- Location: 240 Bentz Mill Rd., Washington Township, Pennsylvania
- Coordinates: 40°02′26″N 77°00′50″W
- Area: 100 acres (40 ha)
- Architectural style: Sweitzer barn
- NRHP reference No.: 00001382
- Added to NRHP: November 15, 2000

The Henry and Elizabeth Berkheimer Farm is an historic home and farm complex which is located in Washington Township, York County, Pennsylvania.

It was added to the National Register of Historic Places in 2000.

== History and architectural features ==
This complex includes the farmhouse, which was built in 1817, the Sweitzer barn, which was erected in 1847, a summer kitchen, which was built circa 1840, and a wagon shed that was erected circa 1870. Also located on the property are a woodshed, hog barn, poultry house, and seed house, all of which were built sometime around 1920; a metal windmill which dates to 1909; and the site of an early 19th-century woolen mill and millrace. The farmhouse is a banked, two-and-one-half-story Pennsylvania German, vernacular dwelling built of rough cut brownstone. It measures forty-eight feet wide by twenty-three feet deep.
