= Bridge in Washington Township =

Historic double-intersection Pratt truss bridge in Pennsylvania

- U.S. National Register of Historic Places
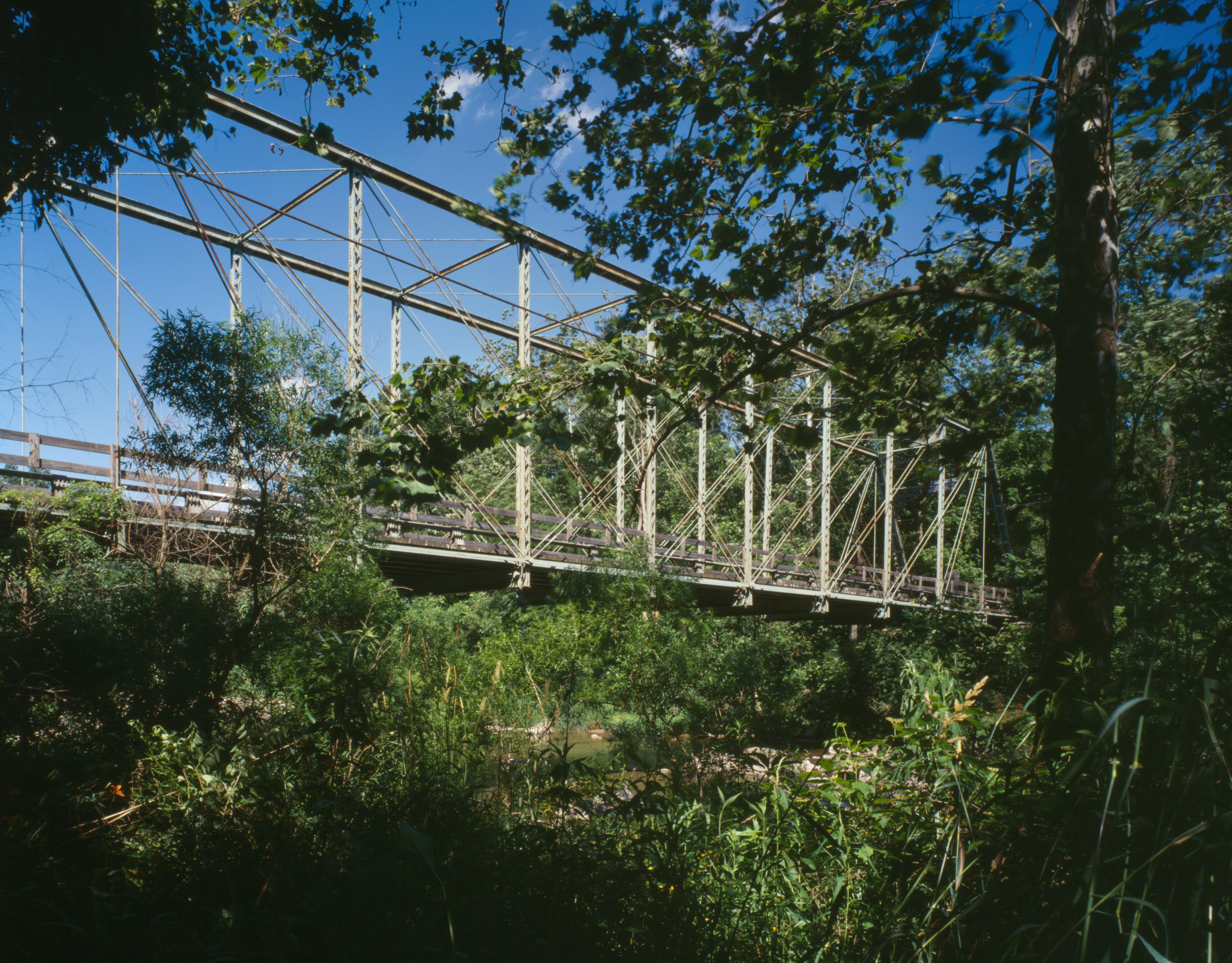
- Kralltown Road Bridge, Summer 1997

- Location within Pennsylvania Location within the United States
- Location: Legislative Route 66150 (SR 4017) over Bermudian Creek, south of Kralltown, Washington Township, York County, Pennsylvania
- Coordinates: 40°0′31″N 76°57′46″W
- Area: less than one acre
- Built: 1884
- Built by: Wrought Iron Bridge Co.
- Architectural style: Pratt truss
- MPS: Highway Bridges Owned by the Commonwealth of Pennsylvania, Department of Transportation TR
- NRHP reference No.: 88000817
- Added to NRHP: June 22, 1988

Bridge in Washington Township, also known as Kralltown Road Bridge, was a double-intersection Pratt truss bridge spanning Bermudian Creek near Kralltown, Washington Township, York County, Pennsylvania. The bridge was built in 1884 by the Wrought Iron Bridge Company and measured 153 feet (47 m) in overall length.

It was added to the National Register of Historic Places in 1988. The historic wrought iron truss has since been replaced with a two-span prestressed concrete box girder bridge.

== See also ==
- List of bridges documented by the Historic American Engineering Record in Pennsylvania
