= Detters Mill, Pennsylvania =

Community in Pennsylvania, U.S.

Coordinates: 40°00′51″N 76°55′38″W

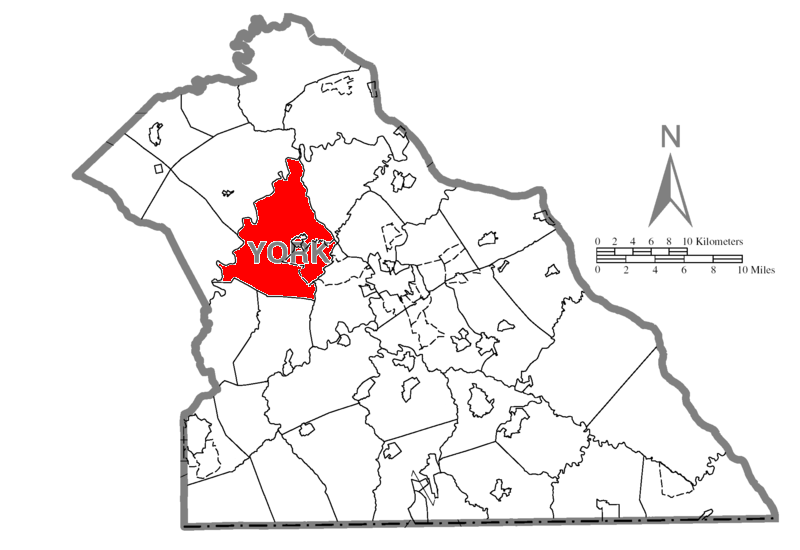
Detters Mill was along the border of Dover Township (shown in red) and Warrington Township in rural northwestern York County, Pennsylvania.

Detters Mill was a small 19th-century community in Dover Township, York County, Pennsylvania, United States, located 2.5 miles (4.0 km) south of Wellsville, and 17 miles (27 km) southwest of Harrisburg.

In 1830, a local miller named George Sheffer constructed a stone grist mill on Harmony Grove Road near the confluence of Bermudian Creek and Conewago Creek. A few other families later constructed homes in the vicinity. The mill, located on the eastern bank of Conewago Creek, closed in the early 20th century and the community waned. The covered bridge of the township collapsed in 1965. As of 2008, the old mill was being used as an apartment complex.
