= Washington Township, York County, Pennsylvania =

Township in Pennsylvania, US

Coordinates: 39°59′00″N 77°05′59″W

- Township
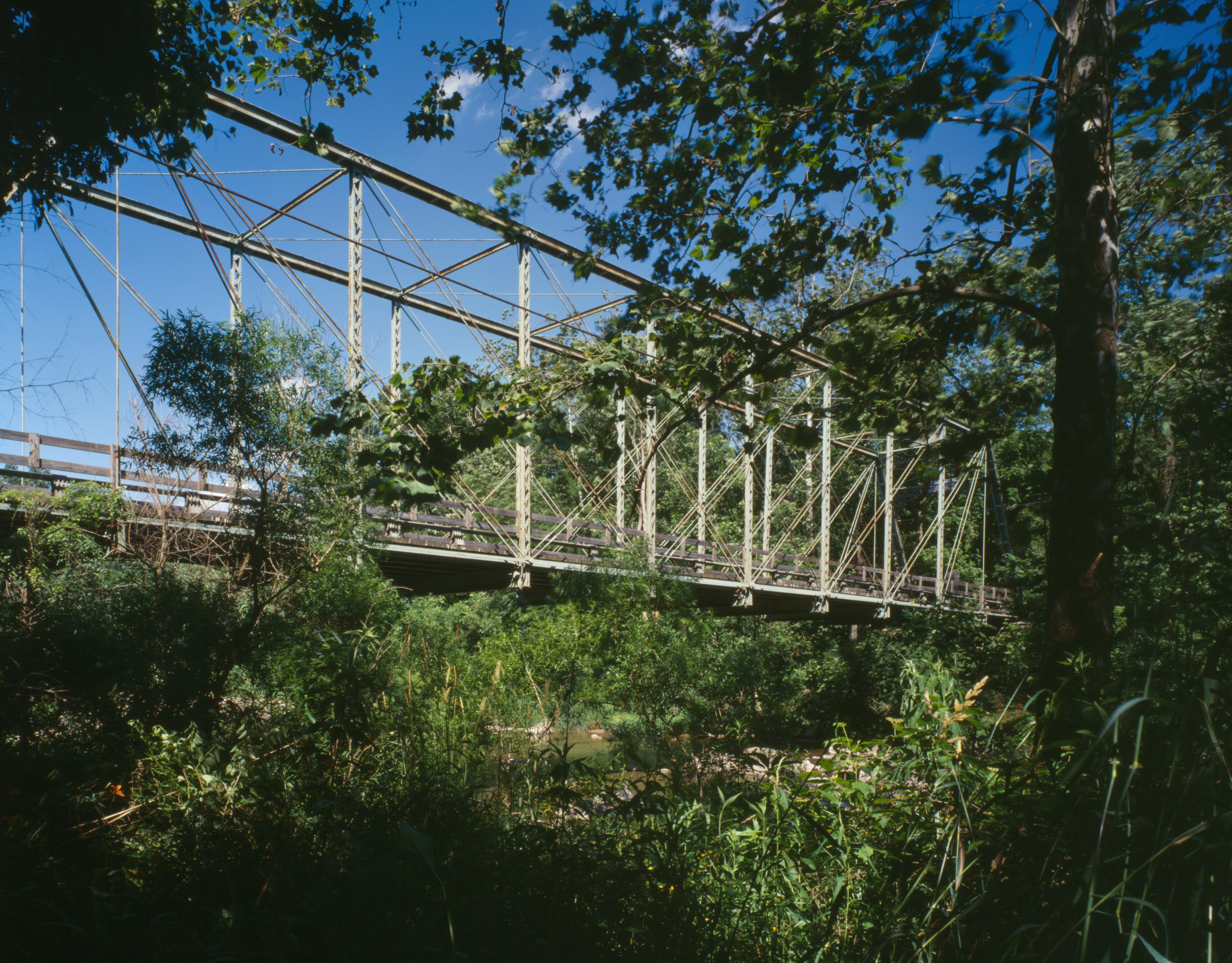
- Kralltown Road Bridge (1884); National Register of Historic Places

- Location in York County and the state of Pennsylvania.
- Country: United States
- State: Pennsylvania
- County: York
- Settled: 1738
- Incorporated: 1803

Government
  - Type: Board of Supervisors

Area
  - Total: 28.06 sq mi (72.67 km^{2})
  - Land: 28.04 sq mi (72.63 km^{2})
  - Water: 0.012 sq mi (0.03 km^{2})

Population (2020)
  - Total: 2,581 ▼
  - Estimate (2023): 2,600
  - Density: 95.4/sq mi (36.83/km^{2})
- Time zone: UTC-5 (Eastern (EST))
  - Summer (DST): UTC-4 (EDT)
- Area code: 717
- FIPS code: 42-133-81352
- Website: https://washingtontownshipyc.net/

Historical population
Census	Pop.	Note	%±
2000	2,460		—
2010	2,673		8.7%
2020	2,581		−3.4%
2023 (est.)	2,600		0.7%
U.S. Decennial Census

Washington Township is a township in York County, Pennsylvania, United States. The population was 2,581 at the 2020 census. Kralltown is one of the township's unincorporated communities.

== History ==
The Bridge in Washington Township and Henry and Elizabeth Berkheimer Farm are listed on the National Register of Historic Places.

== Geography ==
According to the United States Census Bureau, the township has a total area of 27.9 square miles (72 km^{2}), of which 0.04% is water.

== Demographics ==
As of the census of 2000, there were 2,460 people, 890 households, and 696 families residing in the township. The population density was 88.3 inhabitants per square mile (34.1/km^{2}). There were 941 housing units at an average density of 33.8 per square mile (13.1/km^{2}). The racial makeup of the township was 98.50% White, 0.33% African American, 0.04% Native American, 0.12% Asian, 0.20% from other races, and 0.81% from two or more races. Hispanic or Latino of any race were 0.37% of the population.

There were 890 households, out of which 34.4% had children under the age of 18 living with them, 69.6% were married couples living together, 5.2% had a female householder with no husband present, and 21.7% were non-families. 16.3% of all households were made up of individuals, and 6.5% had someone living alone who was 65 years of age or older. The average household size was 2.76 and the average family size was 3.09.

In the township the population was spread out, with 26.9% under the age of 18, 6.1% from 18 to 24, 31.1% from 25 to 44, 25.7% from 45 to 64, and 10.2% who were 65 years of age or older. The median age was 37 years. For every 100 females, there were 102.8 males. For every 100 females age 18 and over, there were 102.7 males.

The median income for a household in the township was $52,278, and the median income for a family was $57,196. Males had a median income of $36,901 versus $26,122 for females. The per capita income for the township was $20,550. About 2.8% of families and 5.1% of the population were below the poverty line, including 2.2% of those under age 18 and 17.4% of those age 65 or over.
