= Beaver Creek (Conewago Creek tributary) =

Tributary of the Conewago Creek in Pennsylvania

Coordinates: 39.937272°N 76.969969°W

Beaver Creek is a 7.0-mile-long (11.3 km) tributary of the Conewago Creek in Adams County, Pennsylvania in the United States.

Beaver Creek joins Conewago Creek at East Berlin.

== See also ==
- List of rivers of Pennsylvania
