= Opossum Creek (Conewago Creek tributary) =

Tributary of the Conewago Creek in Adams County, Pennsylvania

Coordinates: 39°55′46″N 77°11′46″W

Opossum Creek is a 12.8-mile-long (20.6 km) tributary of the Conewago Creek in Adams County, Pennsylvania in the United States.

Opossum Creek joins the Conewago just east of Biglerville.

== See also ==
- List of rivers of Pennsylvania
