= Bennett Run (Conewago Creek tributary) =

Stream in Pennsylvania, USA

Coordinates: 40.111°N 76.797°W

Bennett Run is a 6.8-mile-long (10.9 km) tributary of Conewago Creek in York County, Pennsylvania in the United States.

The Kise Mill Bridge spans Bennett Run in Newberry Township.

== See also ==
- List of rivers of Pennsylvania
