= Newberry Township, Pennsylvania =

Township in Pennsylvania, US

Coordinates: 40°08′00″N 76°49′59″W

- Township
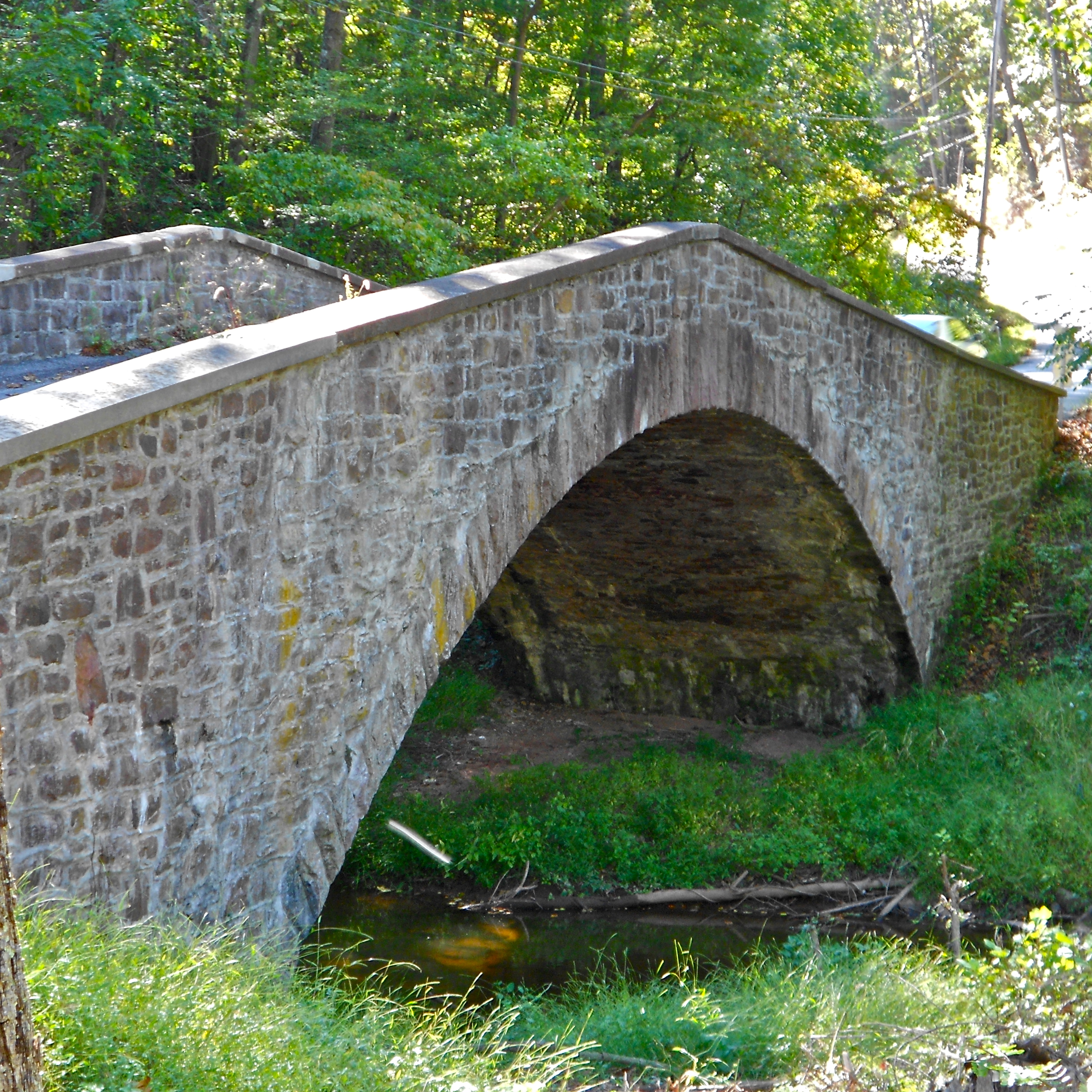
- Kise Mill Bridge over Bennett Run

- Location in York County and the state of Pennsylvania.
- Country: United States
- State: Pennsylvania
- County: York
- Settled: 1736
- Incorporated: 1742

Government
  - Type: Board of Supervisors

Area
  - Total: 30.73 sq mi (79.59 km^{2})
  - Land: 30.42 sq mi (78.78 km^{2})
  - Water: 0.31 sq mi (0.81 km^{2})

Population (2020)
  - Total: 15,670 ▲
  - Estimate (2023): 16,010
  - Density: 509.4/sq mi (196.69/km^{2})
- Time zone: UTC-5 (Eastern (EST))
  - Summer (DST): UTC-4 (EDT)
- Area code: 717
- FIPS code: 42-133-53224
- Website: https://newberrytwp.com/

Historical population
Census	Pop.	Note	%±
2000	14,332		—
2010	15,285		6.6%
2020	15,670		2.5%
2023 (est.)	16,010		2.2%
U.S. Decennial Census

Newberry Township is a township in York County, Pennsylvania, United States. The population was 15,670 at the 2020 census.

== Geography ==
According to the United States Census Bureau, the township has a total area of 30.7 square miles (80 km^{2}), of which 30.4 square miles (79 km^{2}) is land and 0.3 square miles (0.78 km^{2}), or 0.91%, is water. The township is located in northern York County in south-central Pennsylvania. The Susquehanna River forms the eastern border of the township, and the western part of the township entirely surrounds the borough of Lewisberry. The township also contains the census-designated place of Valley Green.

== History ==
Prior to the coming of the first settlers in 1736, Newberry Township was inhabited by the Susquehannock Indians. Before 1736, all settlement in Pennsylvania was kept east of the Susquehanna River, but the Indian Treaty of 1736 extended Lancaster County's boundary westward indefinitely. Quaker families from Lancaster and Chester counties immediately set out across the Susquehanna to find new land. These settlers utilized the Middletown Ferry to access the west bank of the river, and when they reached what is now Newberry Township, they settled throughout the Fishing Creek and Bennetts Run valleys. Newberry Township was organized in 1742 and included what is now called Fairview Township.

Prior to the start of the Revolutionary War, the early Quaker settlers became dissatisfied with the quality of the farmland in the Newberry Township and began to move out. German families from central York County, and Berks and Lancaster counties, soon arrived to take over the vacant farmland.

By the late 18th century, several towns had sprung up throughout the township. Lewisberry and Newberrytown were early Quaker settlements. Newberrytown began as a 42-acre (170,000 m^{2}) tract of Quaker meeting land, with a log meetinghouse built in 1745. Later, a new meetinghouse was built halfway between Lewisberry and the Newberrytown meeting land, and the tract was developed as a town in 1791. Newberrytown was situated on the road from Lancaster to Carlisle (which crossed the Susquehanna River at the York Haven Ferry), and became an important stopping place along the way. Lewisberry was also surveyed and platted in the 1790s. Its stores became busy and prosperous. Schools were operated in both communities.

Early settlers were also attracted to the vicinity of Yocumtown because of the water power of Fishing Creek. They have built fulling mills along its banks that carded wool for area farmers, woolen cloth mills, and grist mills. By the mid-1820s, the village of Yocumtown had established itself with a log schoolhouse, a blacksmith shop, and a tannery.

Goldsboro and York Haven prospered due to their location on the Susquehanna River and adjoining canal route. A ferry was also established at the site of Goldsboro in 1738. Both Goldsboro and the village of Cly were located along the important stagecoach route between York and Harrisburg, where a turnpike was completed between the two towns in 1816. The railroad, built in the late 1830s, also ran through Goldsboro. However, the village remained small through the first half of the 19th century.

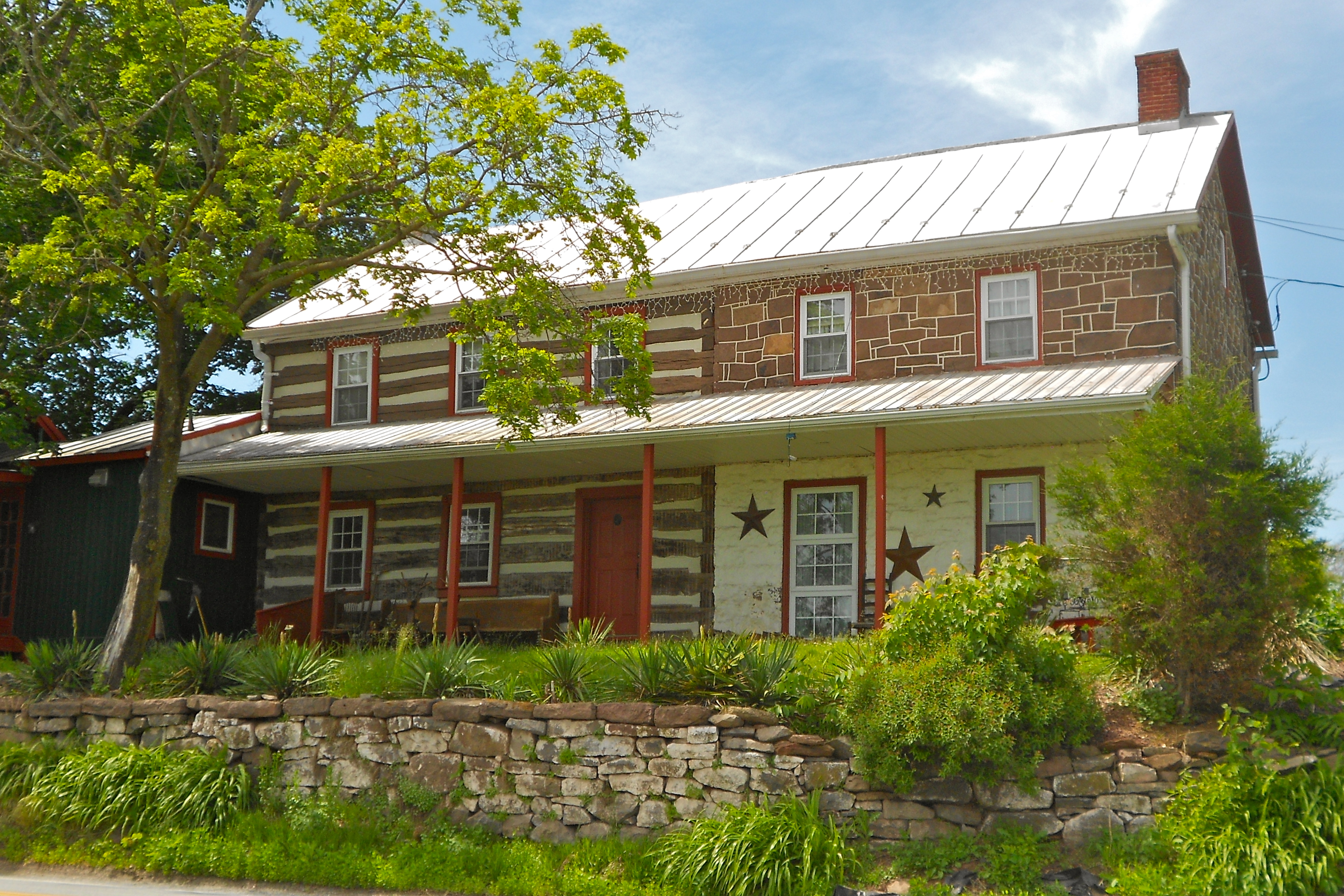
Hammersly-Strominger House built 1790

York Haven, also a ferry point, began as a flour milling town. In 1814, the York Haven Company, which built four large mills, prepared the town plan. Large hotels, dry goods and hardware stores, copper shops that manufactured flour barrels, and a sawmill all became part of the town's healthy economy. Large keelboats of wheat were brought down the river to the mills in York Haven, then the flour was sent by wagon or canal to Baltimore. The town became a popular resort, with city boarders in the summer and gambling at the hotel. Early prosperity began to decline during the 1830s, when the Codorus Canal was completed into the town of York, luring business away from York Haven. The flour mills closed down but were later replaced with a paper mill.

In 1803, Fairview Township was formed from the northern half of the original Newberry Township. Lewisberry incorporated as a separate borough in 1832, as did Goldsboro in 1864 and York Haven in 1892. With these losses of population and area, Newberry Township reached the beginning of the 20th century with a population of just over 2,000 (only 296 more people than in 1783).

During the first two decades of the 20th century, the population of the township actually declined. The following three decades showed a slow, but steady, increase in population. Development to this point (1950) was mainly concentrated along the major roads and villages in the township. Newberrytown, Cly, Conewago Heights, Yocumtown, Erney, and Pleasant Grove were the centers of population at that time.

The Hammersly-Strominger House, Kise Mill Bridge, and Kise Mill Bridge Historic District are listed on the National Register of Historic Places.

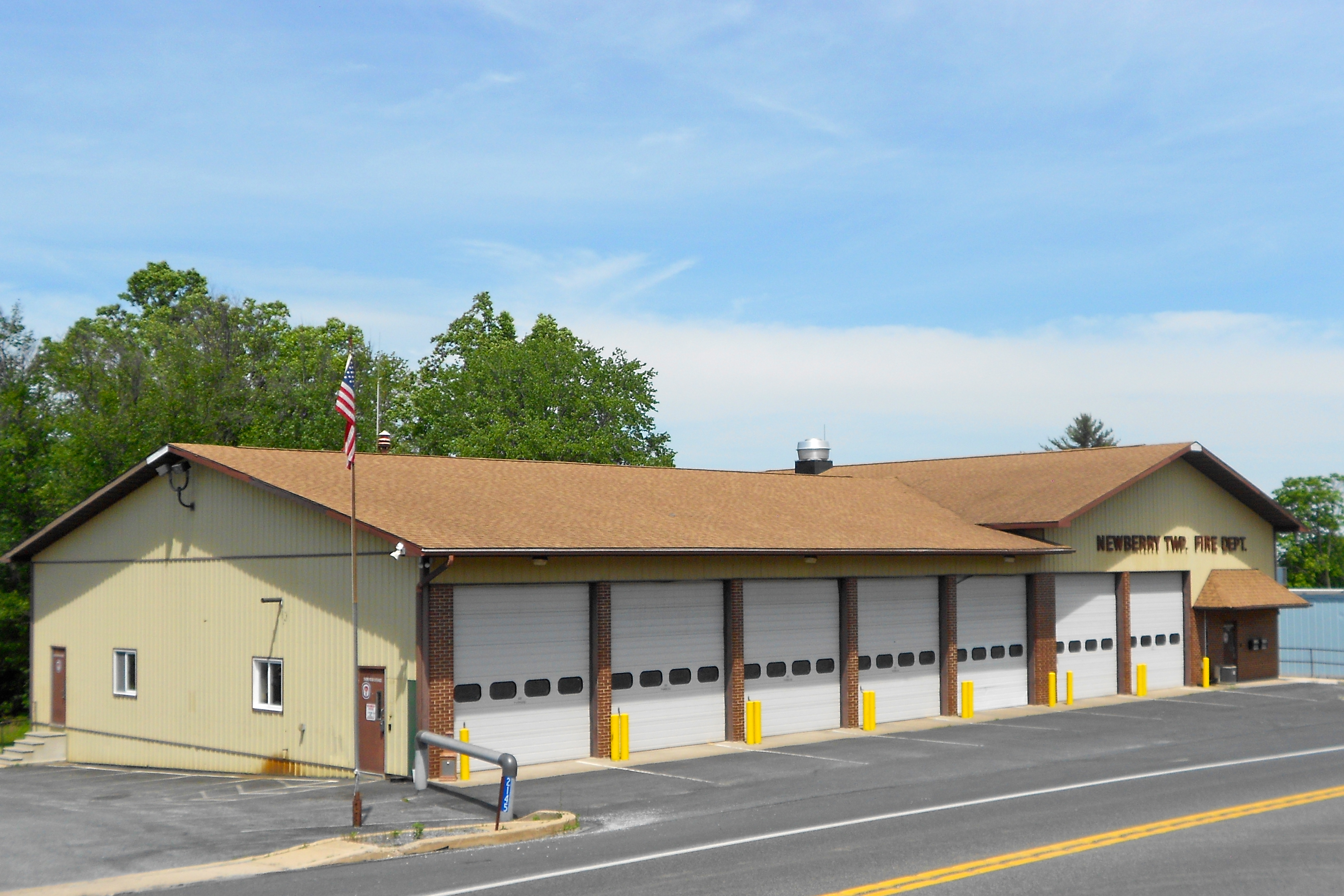
Township Fire Department

== Demographics ==
As of the census of 2000, there were 14,332 people, 5,399 households, and 4,097 families residing in the township. The population density was 470.8 people per square mile (181.8 people/km^{2}). There were 5,706 housing units at an average density of 187.4 per square mile (72.4/km^{2}). The racial makeup of the township was 97.29% White, 0.82% African American, 0.13% Native American, 0.50% Asian, 0.04% Pacific Islander, 0.38% from other races, and 0.84% from two or more races. Hispanic or Latino of any race were 1.49% of the population.

There were 5,399 households, out of which 38.4% had children under the age of 18 living with them, 62.4% were married couples living together, 8.9% had a female householder with no husband present, and 24.1% were non-families. 18.5% of all households were made up of individuals, and 4.6% had someone living alone who was 65 years of age or older. The average household size was 2.65 and the average family size was 3.03.

In the township the population was spread out, with 27.2% under the age of 18, 6.5% from 18 to 24, 35.5% from 25 to 44, 23.3% from 45 to 64, and 7.5% who were 65 years of age or older. The median age was 35 years. For every 100 females there were 100.1 males. For every 100 females age 18 and over, there were 99.6 males.

The median income for a household in the township was $48,043, and the median income for a family was $51,789. Males had a median income of $38,775 versus $27,007 for females. The per capita income for the township was $20,660. About 2.8% of families and 4.7% of the population were below the poverty line, including 4.2% of those under age 18 and 5.4% of those age 65 or over.

== Education ==
Newberry Township is served by the West Shore School District and Northeastern York School District in the southeastern part of the Township.
