= Little Conewago Creek (west) =

Tributary of Conewago Creek in York County, Pennsylvania

Coordinates: 40.041831°N 76.774053°W

Little Conewago Creek is a 24.9-mile-long (40.1 km) tributary of Conewago Creek in York County, Pennsylvania in the United States.

Little Conewago Creek joins the Conewago Creek between the boroughs of York Haven and Manchester.

== See also ==
- List of rivers of Pennsylvania
