= Kise Mill Bridge Historic District =

Historic district in Pennsylvania, United States

- U.S. National Register of Historic Places
- U.S. Historic district
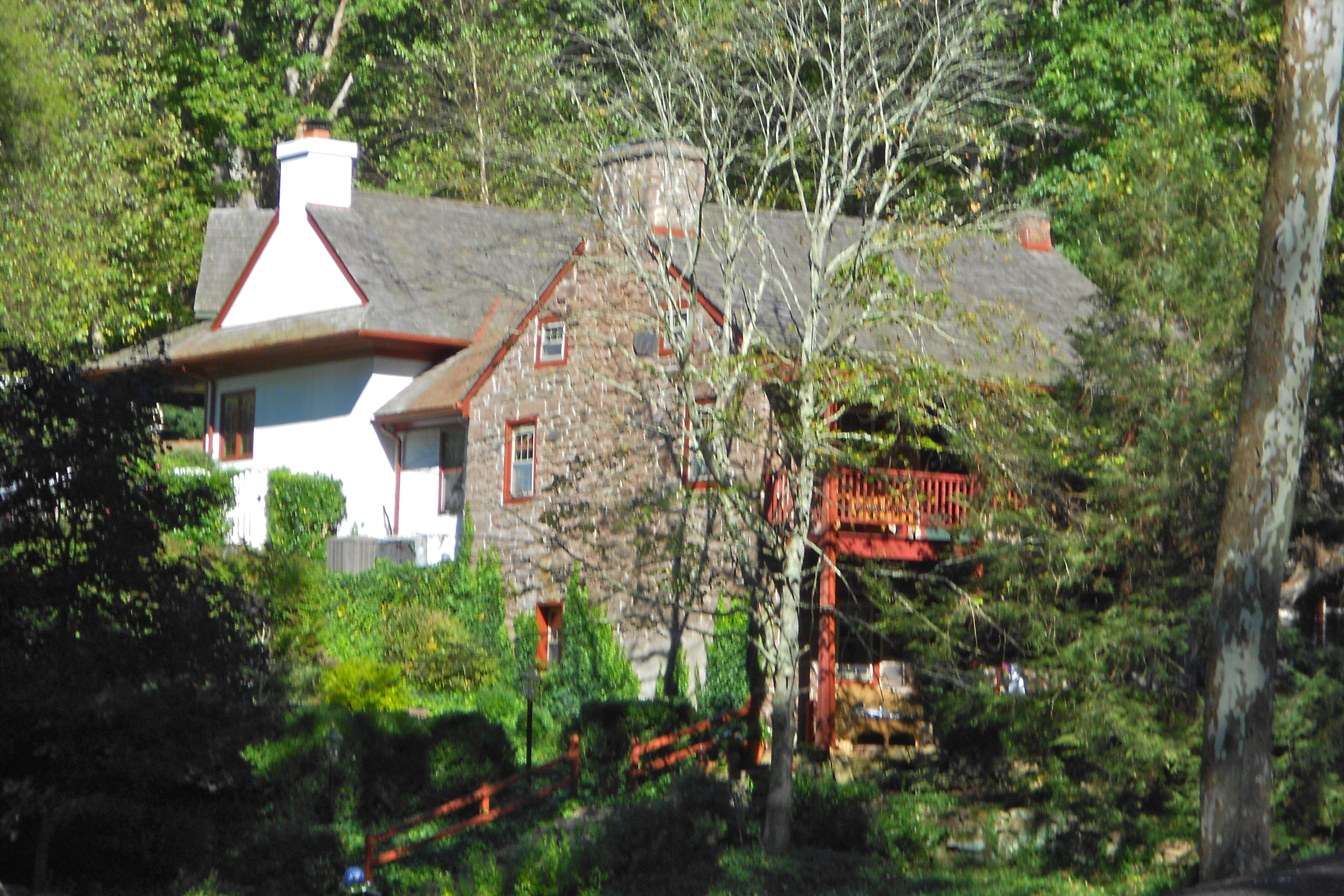
- Miller's house

- Location within Pennsylvania Location within the United States
- Location: Junction of Kise Mill and Roxberry Roads, east of Lewisberry, Newberry Township, Pennsylvania
- Coordinates: 40°6′59.5″N 76°48′35.9″W
- Area: 6 acres (2.4 ha)
- Built: c. 1810
- NRHP reference No.: 80003650
- Added to NRHP: October 15, 1980

The Kise Mill Bridge Historic District, also known as Mickley's Mill, is a national historic district that is located in Newberry Township in York County, Pennsylvania.

It was listed on the National Register of Historic Places in 1980.

== History and architectural features ==
This district encompasses one contributing building, two contributing sites, and four contributing structures, including the miller's house (c. 1810), the buried foundations of a stone grist mill building that was erected in 1840 on the site of a log mill that had been established circa 1790, portions of the head and tailrace, an exposed sawmill foundation, and a mill pond dam. The miller's house is a two-and-one-half-story, three-bay, banked, sandstone dwelling. An early nineteenth century log house was moved to the site in 1973 and attached to the miller's house.

This complex was listed on the National Register of Historic Places in 1980. Also located in the district is the Kise Mill Bridge, which was listed in 1988.
