= Valley Green, Pennsylvania =

Unincorporated place in Pennsylvania, US

Valley Green
- Census-designated place
- Location in York County and the U.S. state of Pennsylvania.
- Coordinates: 40°09′24″N 76°47′41″W
- Country: United States
- State: Pennsylvania
- County: York
- Township: Newberry

Area
  - Total: 1.4 sq mi (3.5 km^{2})
  - Land: 1.4 sq mi (3.5 km^{2})
- Elevation: 400 ft (120 m)

Population (2010)
  - Total: 3,429
  - Density: 2,500/sq mi (980/km^{2})
- Time zone: UTC-5 (Eastern (EST))
  - Summer (DST): UTC-4 (EDT)
- ZIP code: 17319
- Area code: 717
- GNIS feature ID: 2390425

Valley Green is a census-designated place (CDP) in York County, Pennsylvania, United States. The population was 3,429 at the 2010 census.

== Geography ==
Valley Green is located in Newberry Township.

According to the United States Census Bureau, the CDP has a total area of 1.4 square miles (3.6 km^{2}), all land.

== Demographics ==
=== 2020 census ===
As of the 2020 census, Valley Green had a population of 3,412. The median age was 37.7 years. 23.4% of residents were under the age of 18 and 13.7% of residents were 65 years of age or older. For every 100 females there were 94.9 males, and for every 100 females age 18 and over there were 95.4 males age 18 and over.

100.0% of residents lived in urban areas, while 0.0% lived in rural areas.

There were 1,328 households in Valley Green, of which 35.3% had children under the age of 18 living in them. Of all households, 52.9% were married-couple households, 18.0% were households with a male householder and no spouse or partner present, and 19.9% were households with a female householder and no spouse or partner present. About 20.5% of all households were made up of individuals and 5.6% had someone living alone who was 65 years of age or older.

There were 1,365 housing units, of which 2.7% were vacant. The homeowner vacancy rate was 1.3% and the rental vacancy rate was 0.0%.

Racial composition as of the 2020 census
Race	Number	Percent
White	3,046	89.3%
Black or African American	75	2.2%
American Indian and Alaska Native	6	0.2%
Asian	32	0.9%
Native Hawaiian and Other Pacific Islander	0	0.0%
Some other race	49	1.4%
Two or more races	204	6.0%
Hispanic or Latino (of any race)	141	4.1%

=== 2000 census ===
At the 2000 census there were 3,550 people, 1,310 households, and 996 families living in the CDP. The population density was 2,588.5 inhabitants per square mile (999.4/km^{2}). There were 1,355 housing units at an average density of 988.0 per square mile (381.5/km^{2}). The racial makeup of the CDP was 96.17% White, 1.52% African American, 0.03% Native American, 0.87% Asian, 0.06% Pacific Islander, 0.42% from other races, and 0.93% from two or more races. Hispanic or Latino of any race were 2.08%.

Of the 1,310 households 43.9% had children under the age of 18 living with them, 61.9% were married couples living together, 11.0% had a female householder with no husband present, and 23.9% were non-families. 18.0% of households were one person and 2.4% were one person aged 65 or older. The average household size was 2.71 and the average family size was 3.11.

The age distribution was 29.9% under the age of 18, 6.7% from 18 to 24, 38.6% from 25 to 44, 21.6% from 45 to 64, and 3.2% 65 or older. The median age was 33 years. For every 100 females, there were 93.2 males. For every 100 females age 18 and over, there were 92.3 males.

The median household income was $50,683 and the median family income was $53,162. Males had a median income of $41,019 versus $28,348 for females. The per capita income for the CDP was $21,087. About 3.0% of families and 5.2% of the population were below the poverty line, including 5.3% of those under age 18 and none of those age 65 or over.
