= Conewago Creek (west) =

Tributary of the Susquehanna River in Pennsylvania, United States

Coordinates: 40°10′13″N 76°38′07″W

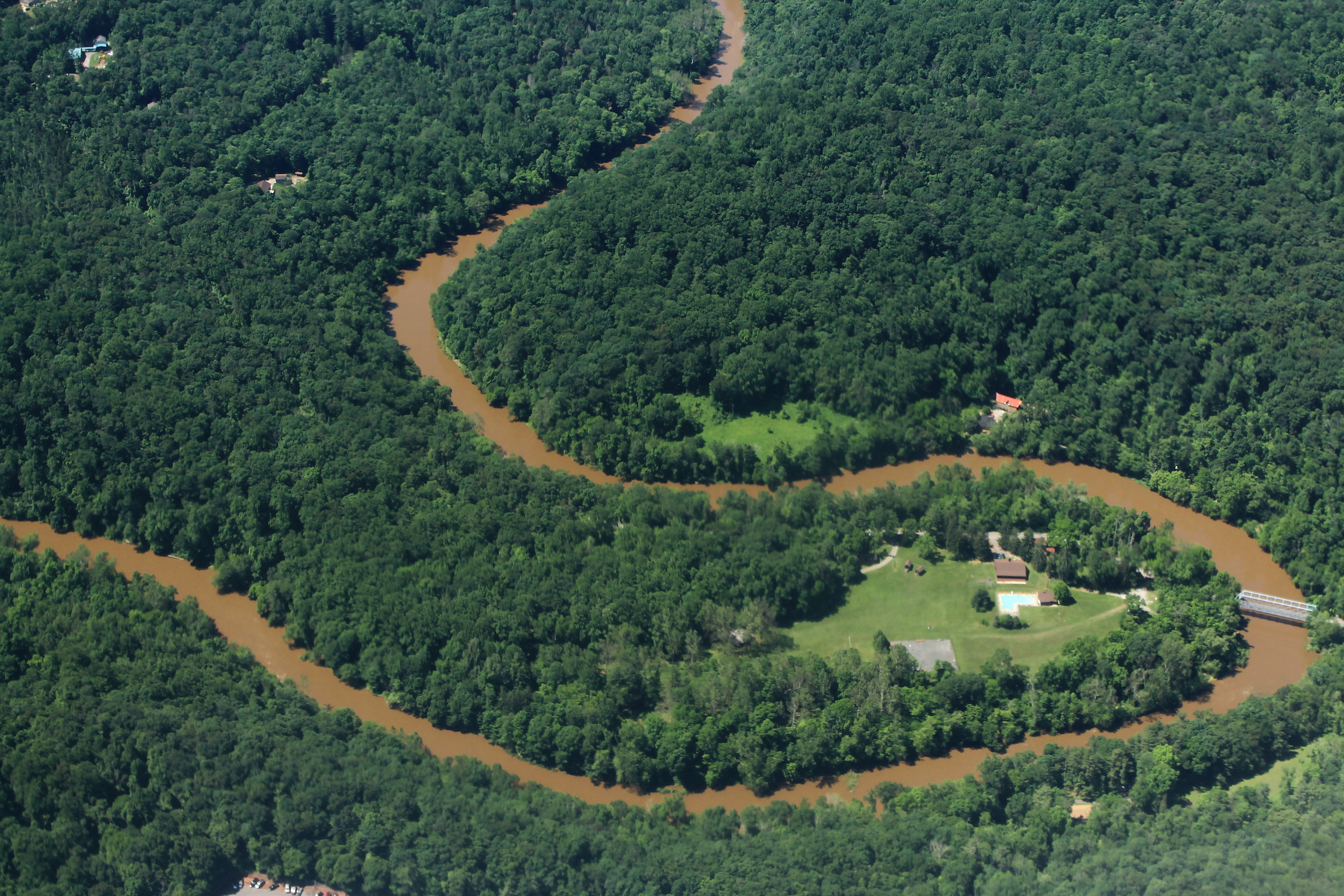
- Aerial view of Conewago Creek in York County

Location
- Country: Carroll County, Maryland and Adams and York Counties, Pennsylvania, United States

Physical characteristics
- Source
  - location: Franklin Township, Adams County, Pennsylvania
  - elevation: 1,440 feet (440 m)
- Mouth
  - location: Susquehanna River at York Haven, Pennsylvania
  - elevation: 259 feet (79 m)
- Length: 80 mi (130 km)
- Basin size: 515 mi^{2} (1,330 km^{2})

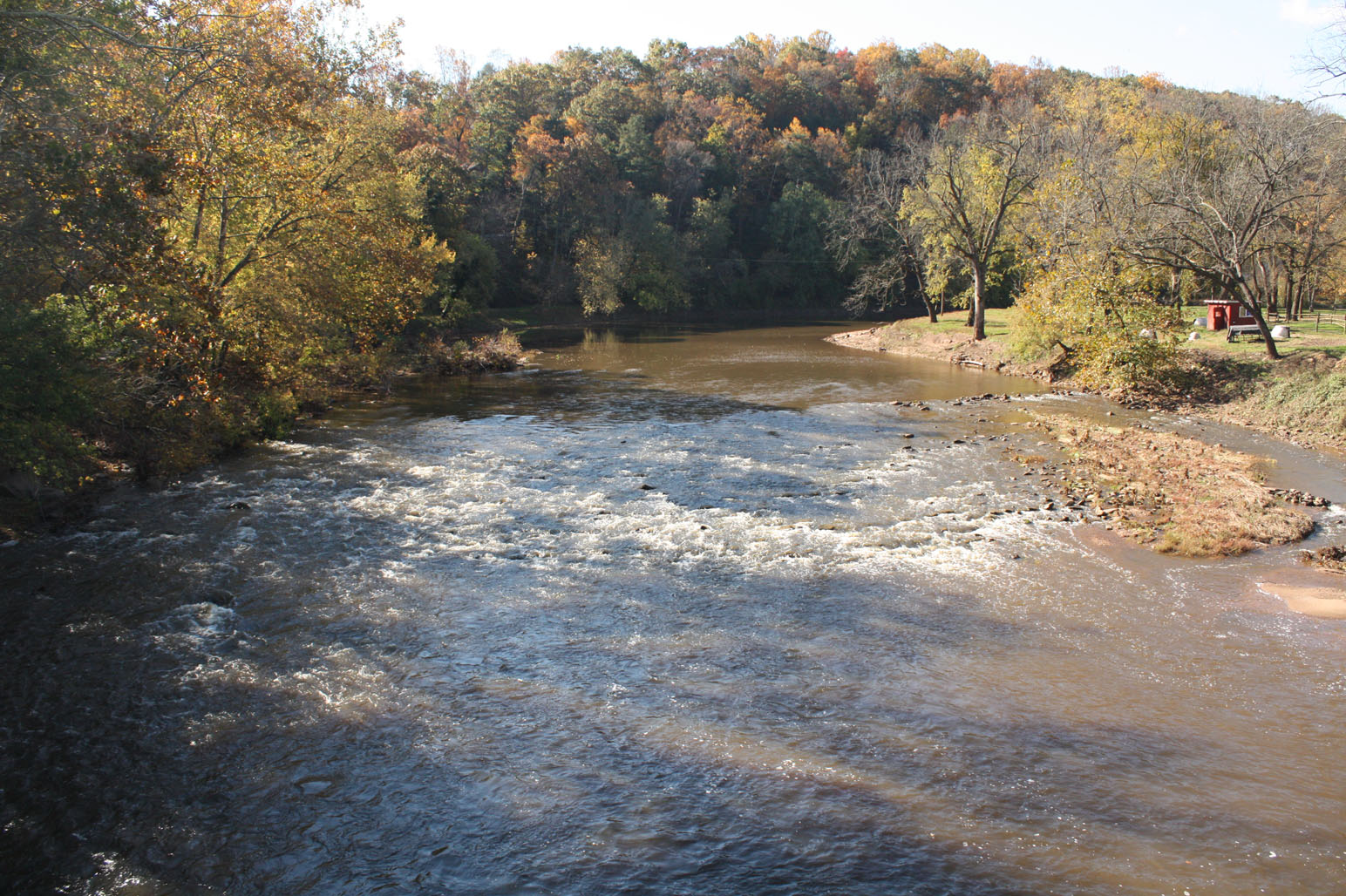
facing south and upstream from bridge on Kunkle Mill Road, York County

Conewago Creek is an 80.2-mile-long (129.1 km) tributary of the Susquehanna River in Adams and York counties in Pennsylvania in the United States, with its watershed also draining a small portion of Carroll County, Maryland. The source is at an elevation of 1,440 feet (440 m), east of Caledonia State Park, in Franklin Township in Adams County. The mouth is the confluence with the Susquehanna River at York Haven in York County at an elevation of 259 feet (79 m).

== Name ==
The name of the creek comes from the Lenape, meaning "at the rapids", although the rapids are not on Conewago Creek. Instead, the rapids are the Conewago Falls beyond the creek's mouth in the Susquehanna River, which also give their name to the other Conewago Creek, whose mouth is on the east bank of the Susquehanna River in Dauphin and Lancaster counties, only 1.6 miles (2.6 km) north of the mouth of this Conewago Creek.

== Course ==
Conewago Creek flows east 39 miles (63 km), then northeast 41 miles (66 km) to its mouth. The source is in Franklin Township in Adams County, and the mouth is at the Susquehanna River at York Haven in York County.

== Watershed ==
The Conewago Creek watershed has a total area of 515 square miles (1,330 km^{2}) and is part of the larger Chesapeake Bay drainage basin via the Susquehanna River. 5.22 square miles (13.5 km^{2}) of the watershed are in Maryland, and the rest is located in Pennsylvania. 50.22% of Adams County is drained by Conewago Creek and its tributaries, while 26.96% of York County is in the creek's watershed.

=== Tributaries ===
- Opossum Creek
- South Branch Conewago Creek
- Bermudian Creek
- Beaver Creek (Adams County)
- Beaver Creek (York County)
- Bennett Run
- Little Conewago Creek (west)

== Recreation ==
Canoeing: Edward Gertler writes that Conewago Creek is "a dull creek.. if you have seen one mile of Conewago, you have seen it all". Canoeing and kayaking on Conewago Creek are possible when the water is high enough (in spring and after hard rain), with 69 miles (111 km) of Class A to Class 1 whitewater located upstream of the mouth.

Fishing: A small section of Conewago Creek in western Adams County has been designated as approved trout waters by the Pennsylvania Fish and Boat Commission. This means the waters will be stocked with trout and may be fished during trout season. Further downstream in Adams County there is a small "catch and release" section of the creek.

The creek is home to a variety of fish including smallmouth bass, walleye, bluegill, rock bass, sunfish, carp, channel catfish, flathead catfish, yellow perch, rainbow trout, muskellunge and crappie.

== Bridges and dams ==
There are many crossings and dams, some of which are named:

- Bridge between East Manchester and Newberry Townships
- Ganoga Bridge
- East Berlin Dam
- Browns Dam
- Dicks Dam
- Detters Mill Dam
- Sharrer Mill Dam
- Kuhn's Fording Bridge - removed
- Harlacher Bridge
- Sheeps Bridge
- Iron Bridge near Biglerville

== See also ==
- List of rivers of Pennsylvania
