= Kise Mill Bridge =

- U.S. National Register of Historic Places
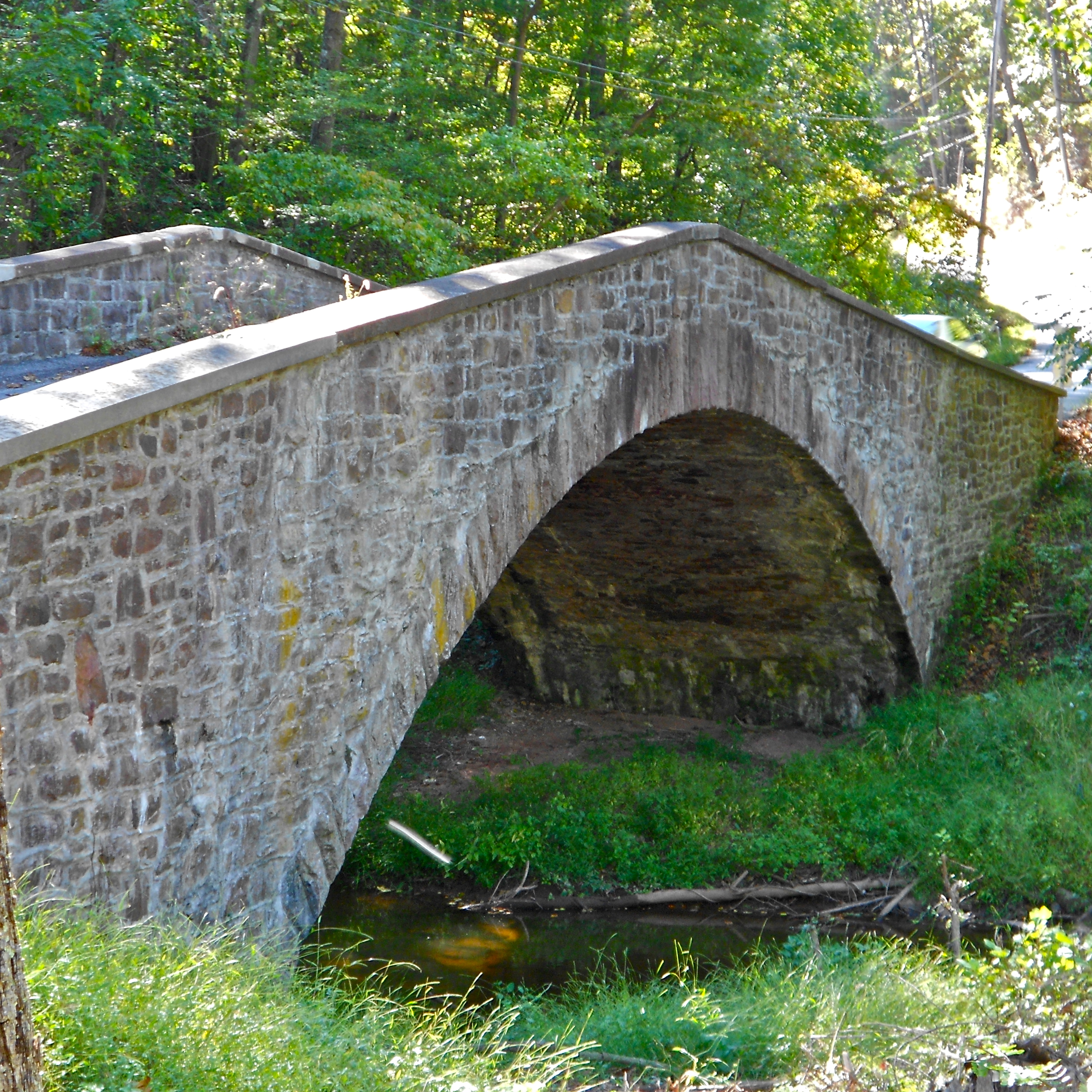
- Kise Mill Bridge, 2013

- Location within Pennsylvania Location within the United States
- Location: Legislative Route 66003 over Bennett Run, east of Lewisberry, Newberry Township, Pennsylvania
- Coordinates: 40°6′56″N 76°48′38″W
- Area: less than one acre
- Built: 1915
- Architect: Charles A. Williams; William Wagman & Bro.
- Architectural style: Camelback single span arch
- MPS: Highway Bridges Owned by the Commonwealth of Pennsylvania, Department of Transportation TR
- NRHP reference No.: 88000799
- Added to NRHP: June 22, 1988

The Kise Mill Bridge is a historic, American, camelback, stone arch bridge that is located in Newberry Township, York County, Pennsylvania.

It was added to the National Register of Historic Places in 1988. It is located in the Kise Mill Bridge Historic District.

== History and architectural features ==
Built in 1915, this rubble masonry-style bridge is roughly sixty-eight feet long and crosses Bennett Run.

In 2014, this long-used bridge was deemed too historically important to be replaced, and was subsequently repaired. The project took nearly three years to complete.

== Gallery ==
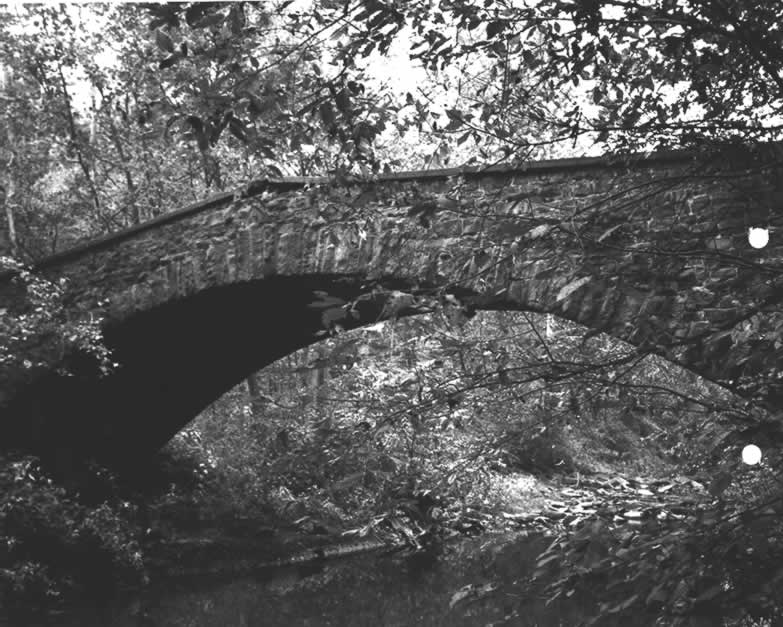
In 1982

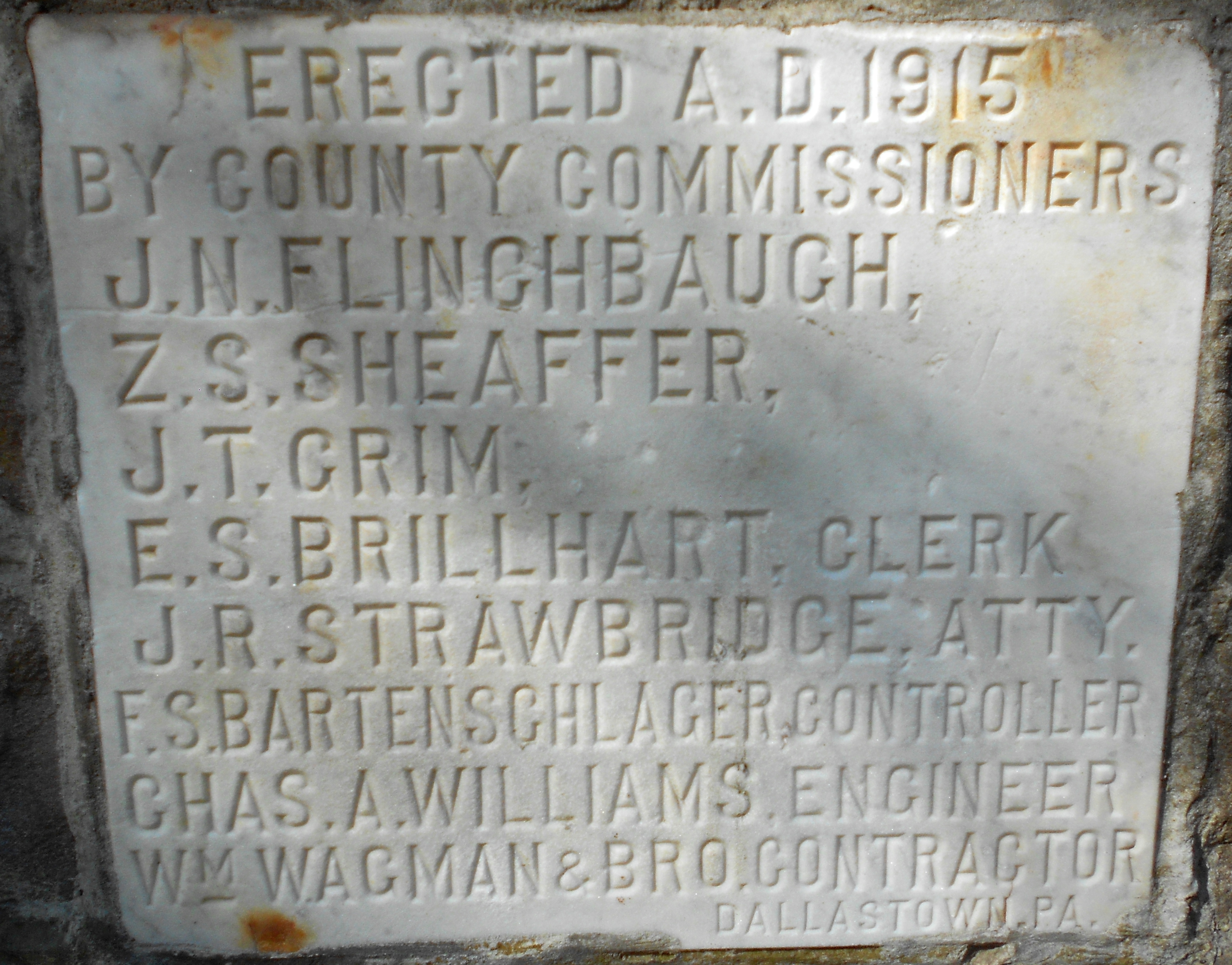
Datestone

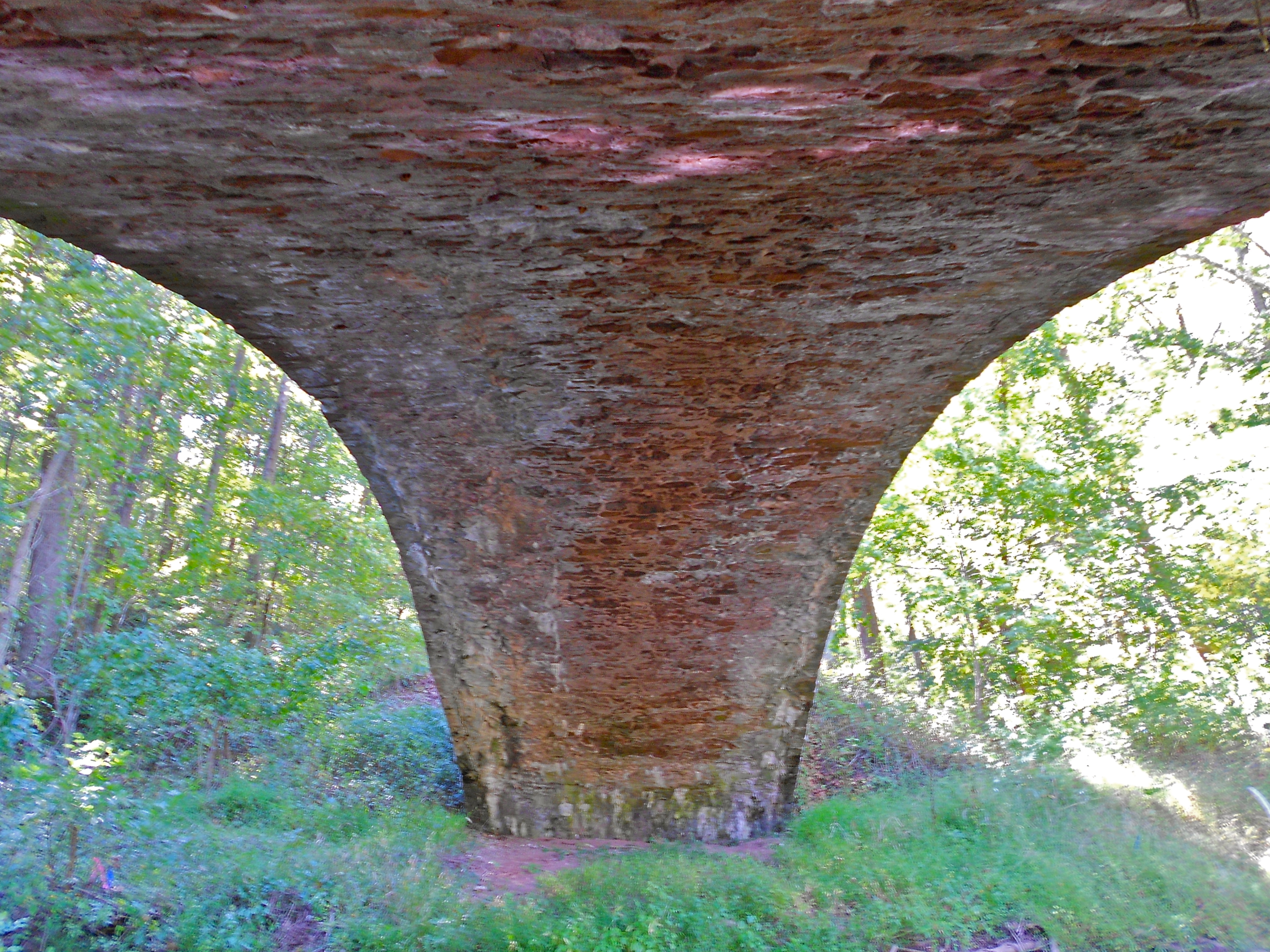
Underneath the bridge
