= Bullion Mountain =

Mountain in Alaska, United States

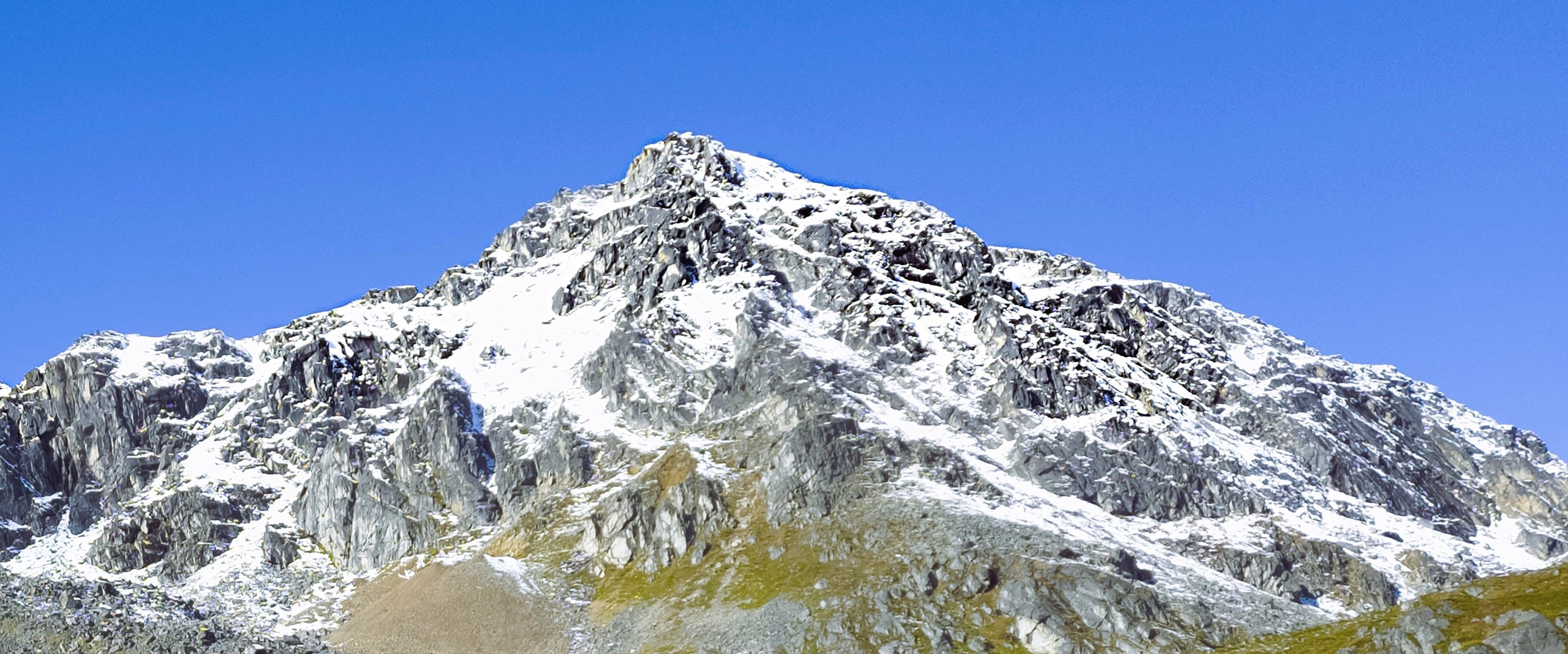
- Southeast aspect

Highest point
- Elevation: 5,086 ft (1,550 m)
- Prominence: 400 ft (122 m)
- Isolation: 0.95 mi (1.53 km)
- Coordinates: 61°47′45″N 149°18′33″W

Naming
- Etymology: Bullion

Geography
- Location within Alaska
- Interactive map of Bullion Mountain
- Country: United States
- State: Alaska
- Borough: Matanuska-Susitna
- Parent range: Talkeetna Mountains
- Topo map: USGS Anchorage D-7

Bullion Mountain is a 5,086-foot-elevation (1,550-meter) summit in Alaska, United States.

== Description ==
Bullion Mountain is located 14 miles (22.5 km) northwest of Palmer, Alaska, in the Talkeetna Mountains, on land managed as the Hatcher Pass Management Area of the state park system. It is also immediately west of the Independence Mine State Historic Park. Precipitation runoff from this mountain's east slope drains to the nearby Little Susitna River via Fishhook Creek, whereas the west side drains to the Susitna River via Willow Creek. Topographic relief is significant as the summit rises 1,580 feet (482 meters) above the Independence Mines in 0.75 miles (1.21 km). Access is via the Palmer-Fishhook Road (also called Hatcher Pass Road). This mountain's toponym has been officially adopted by the United States Board on Geographic Names as a local name reported in 1951 by U.S. Geological Survey. The Gold Bullion Mine located high on the northwest slope of the mountain produced 77,000 ounces of gold from 1908 to 1951.

== Climate ==
Based on the Köppen climate classification, Bullion Mountain is located in a subarctic climate zone with long, cold, snowy winters, and short cool summers. Winter temperatures can drop below 0 °F with wind chill factors below −10 °F. The months of May through June offer the most favorable weather for climbing or viewing.

== Geology ==
The Willow Creek mining district at Hatcher Pass is historically the third-largest lode-gold producing district in Alaska, having produced 624,000 ounces of gold. Mining of placer gold deposits began in 1906. Hardrock gold mining began a few years later from high-grade vein lode deposits.

The Willow Creek mining district lies at the southwestern edge of a great mass of granitic intrusions that form much of the Talkeetna Mountains and is within the Wrangellia composite terrane. At Hatcher Pass a pervasively altered zoned 74 million years old quartz diorite to tonalite pluton underlies the headwaters of Willow Creek and Fishhook Creek, with most of the gold deposits occurring in these rocks. A 67 Ma quartz monzonite pluton lies west and north of the older quartz diorite, a Cretaceous quartz diorite pluton lies to the east. South of Bullion Mountain, a high angle east–west fault passing through Hatcher Pass separates plutonic rocks on the north side of the fault from schist south of the fault.

== Gallery ==
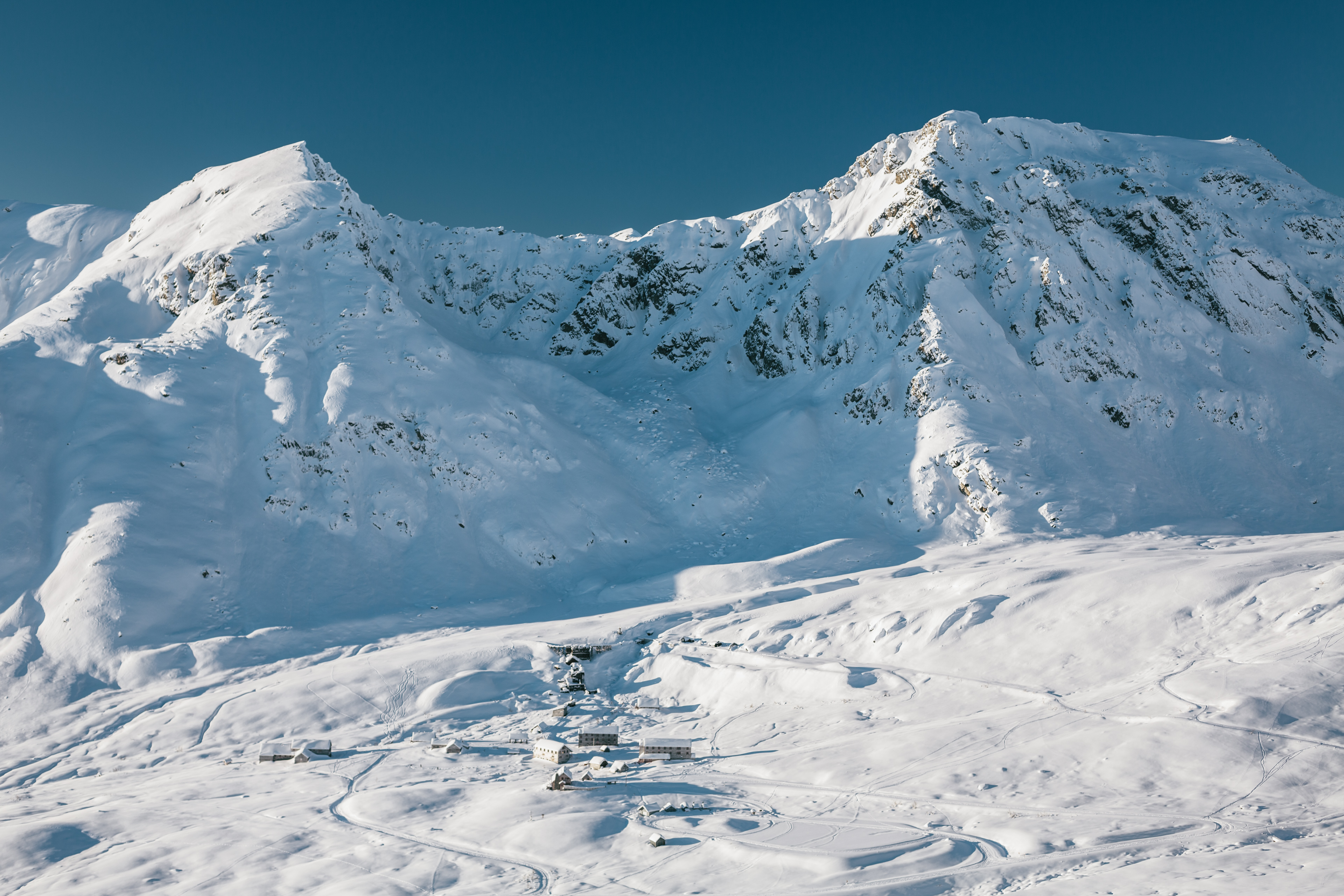
East aspect of Bullion (right), Independence Mines centered at bottom.

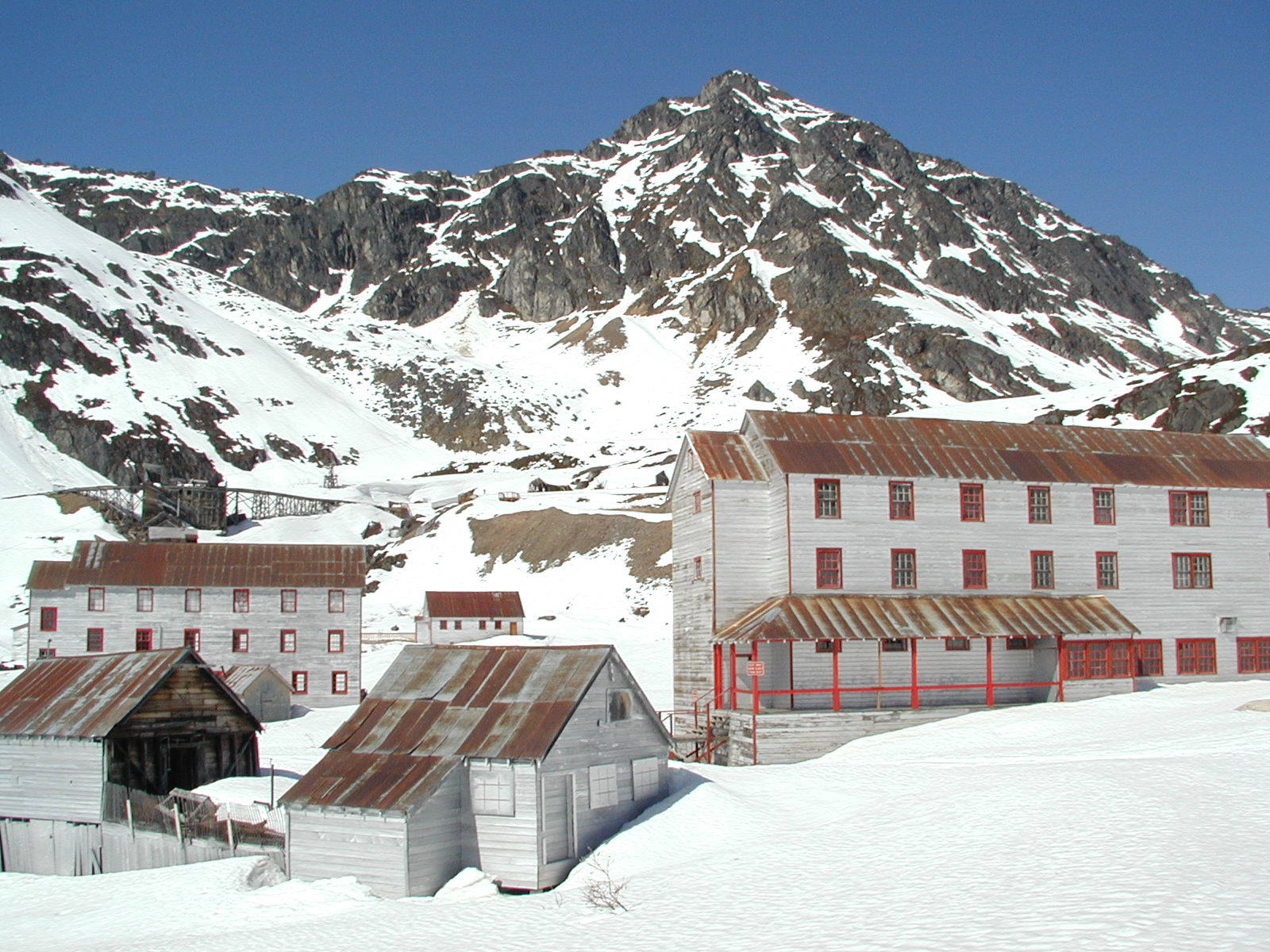
Southeast aspect of Bullion viewed from Independence Mines

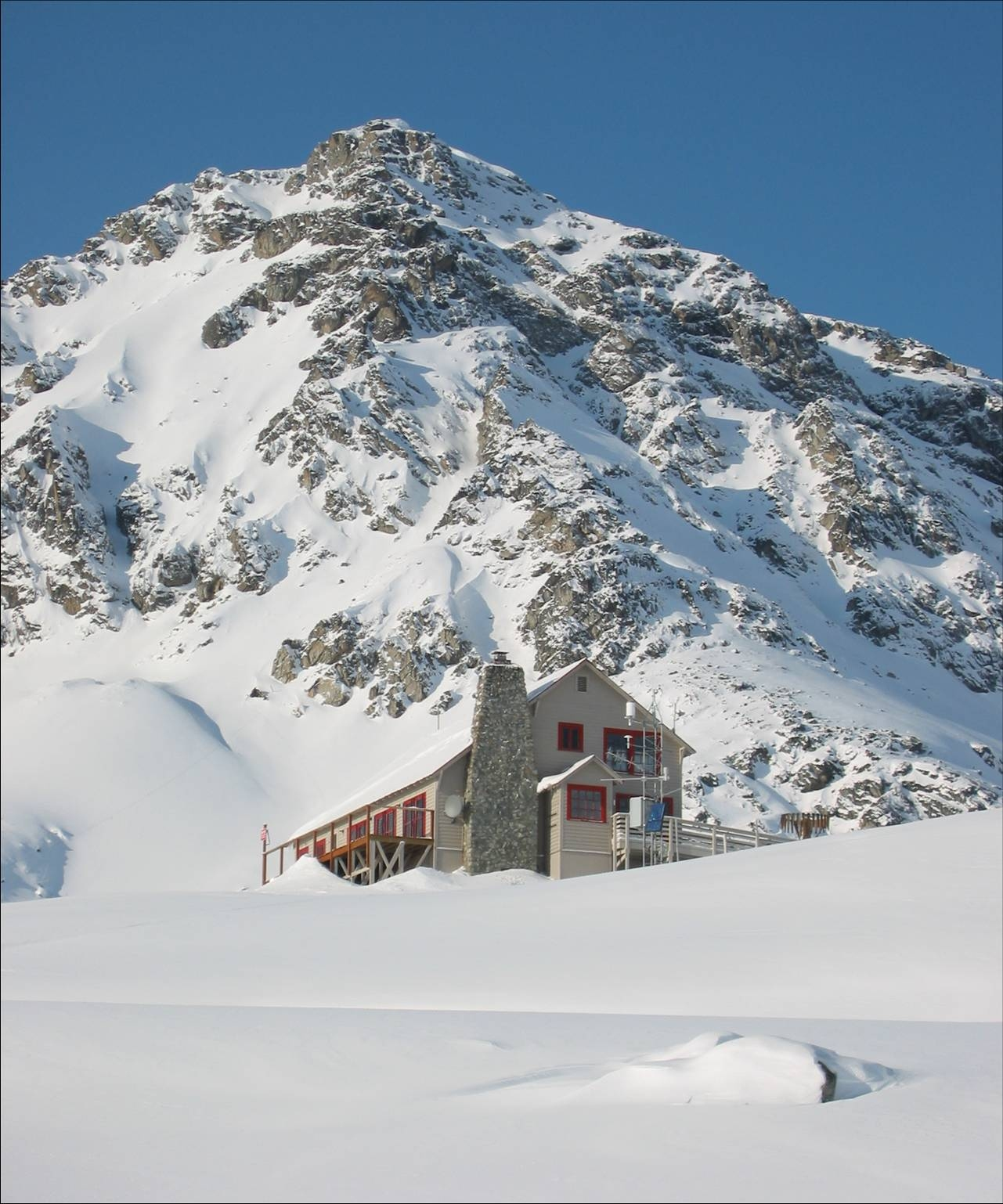
Southeast aspect

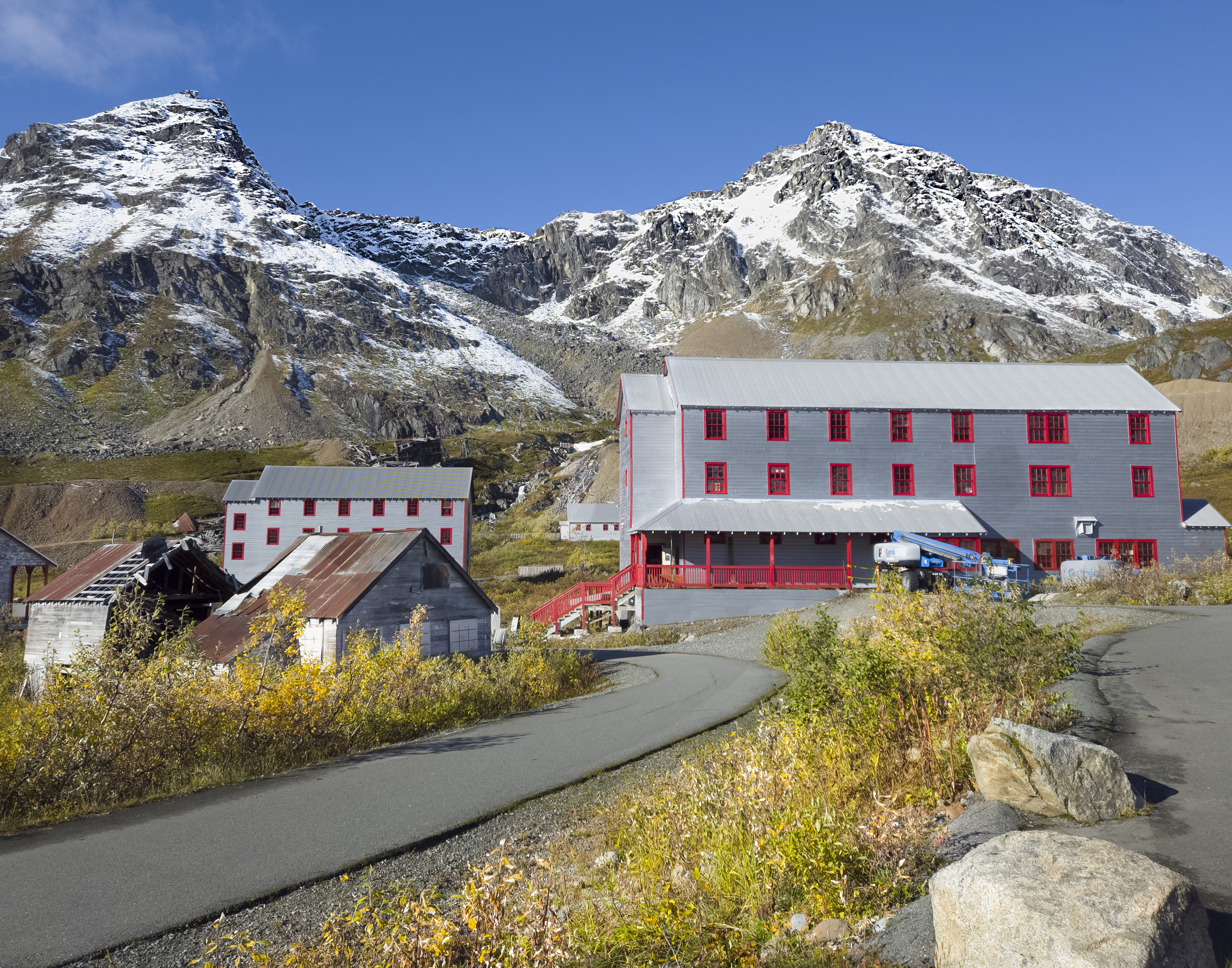
Southeast aspect of Bullion (upper right), Independence Mines centered

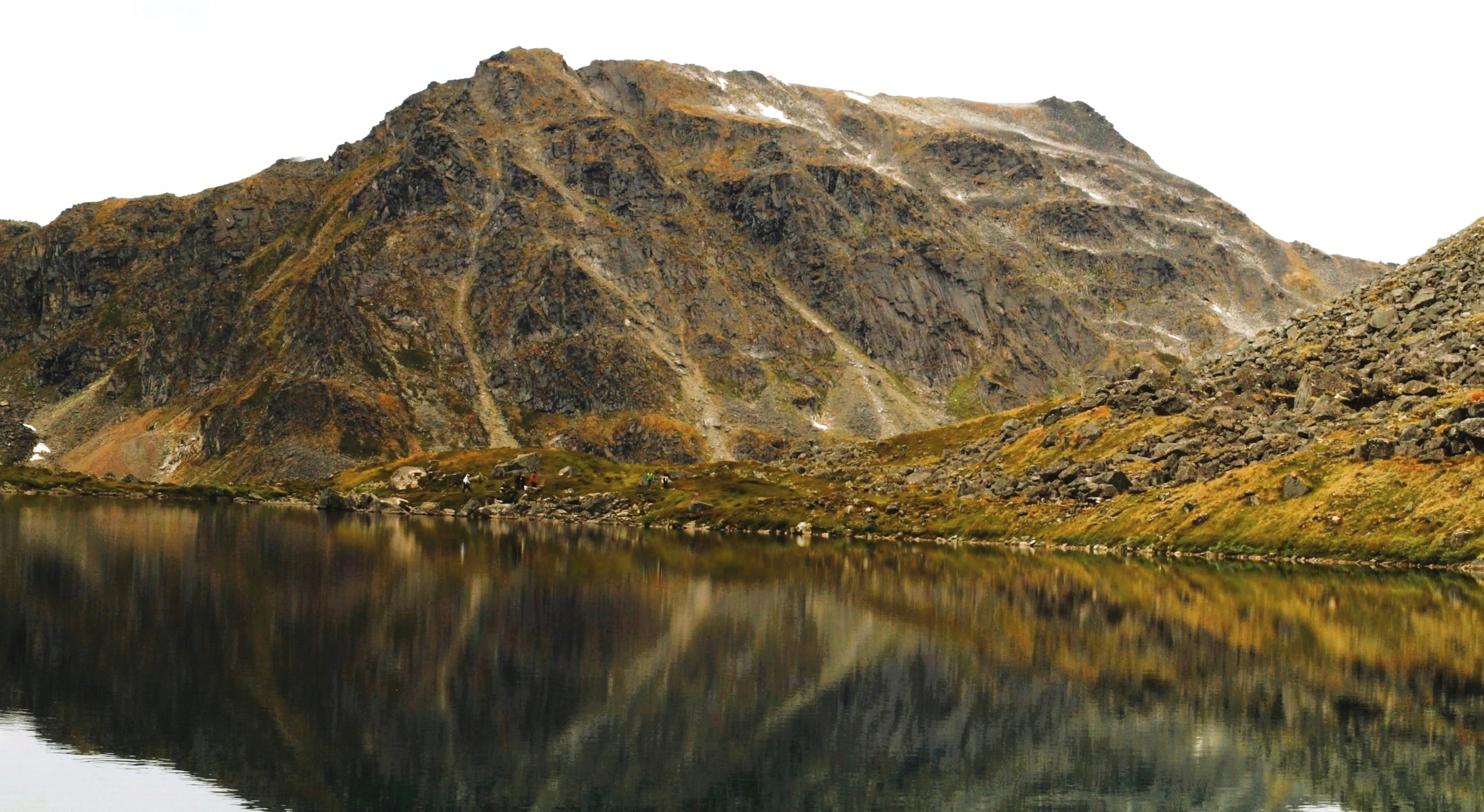
East aspect of Bullion Mountain reflected in Gold Cord Lake

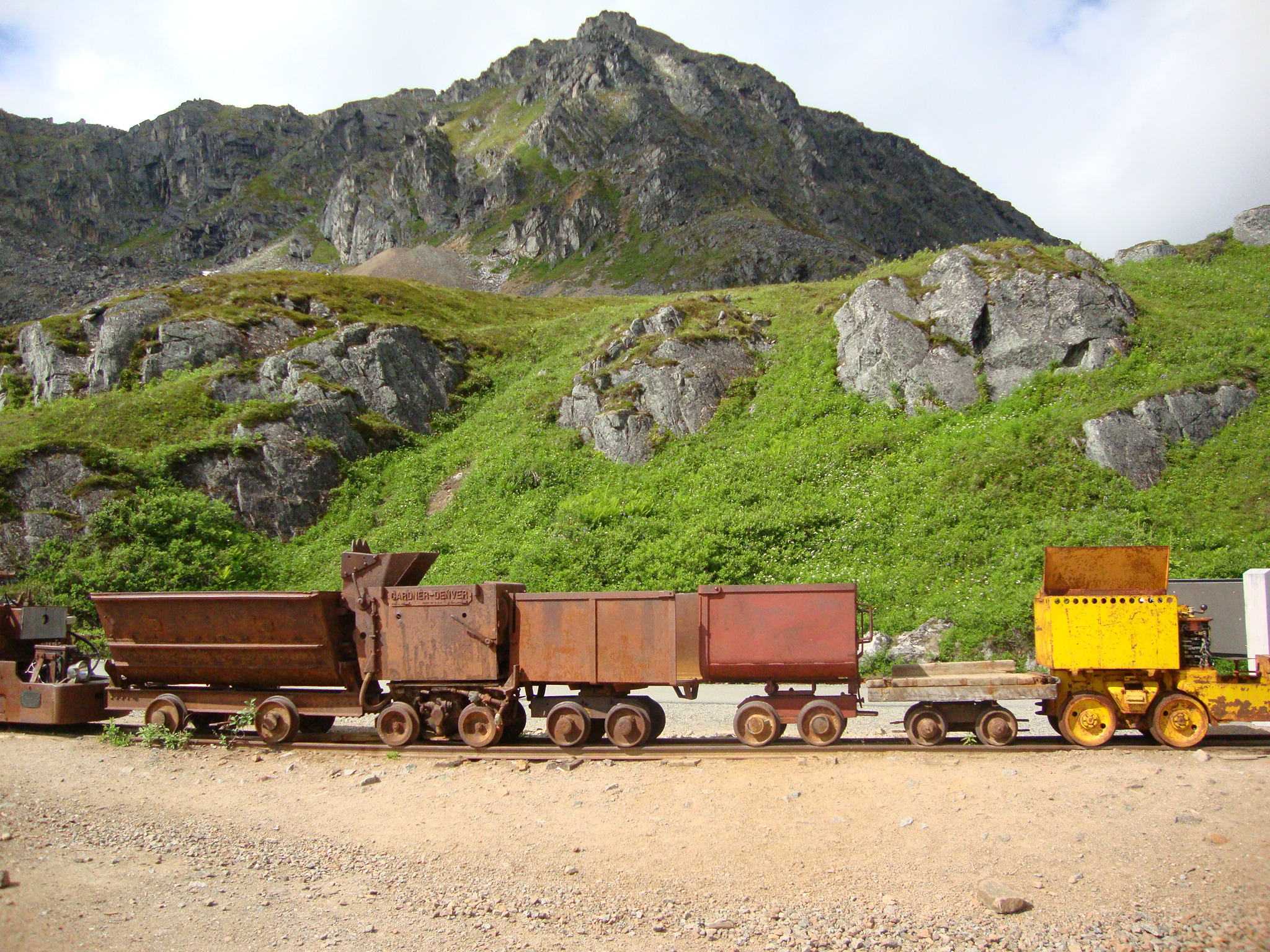

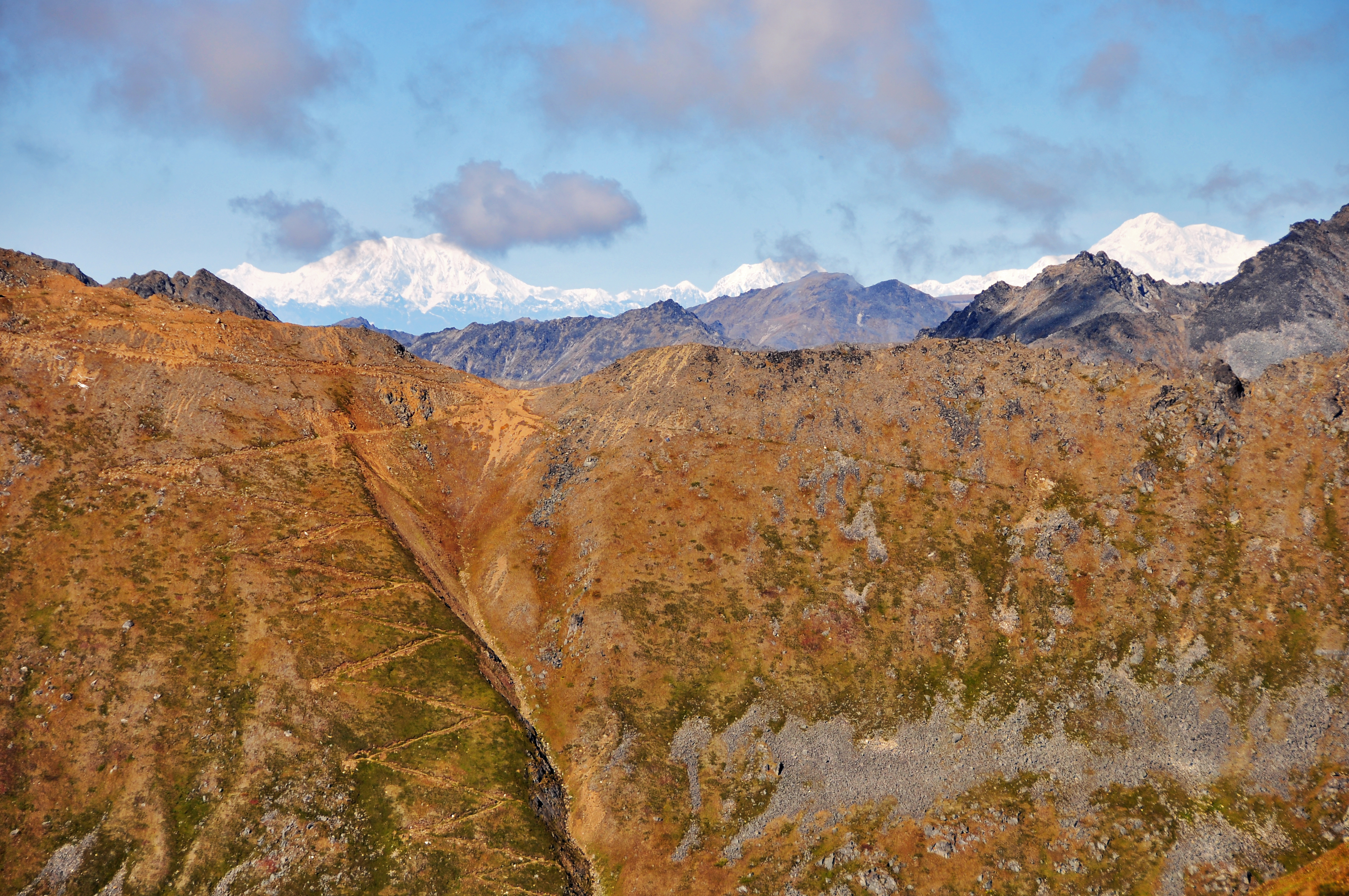
The reddish ridge is part of Bullion Mountain with switchbacks that lead up to Gold Bullion Mine. On the horizon are Mount Foraker and Denali. View from Skyscraper Mountain.

== See also ==
- Geography of Alaska
