= Skyscraper Mountain (Alaska) =

Mountain in Alaska, United States

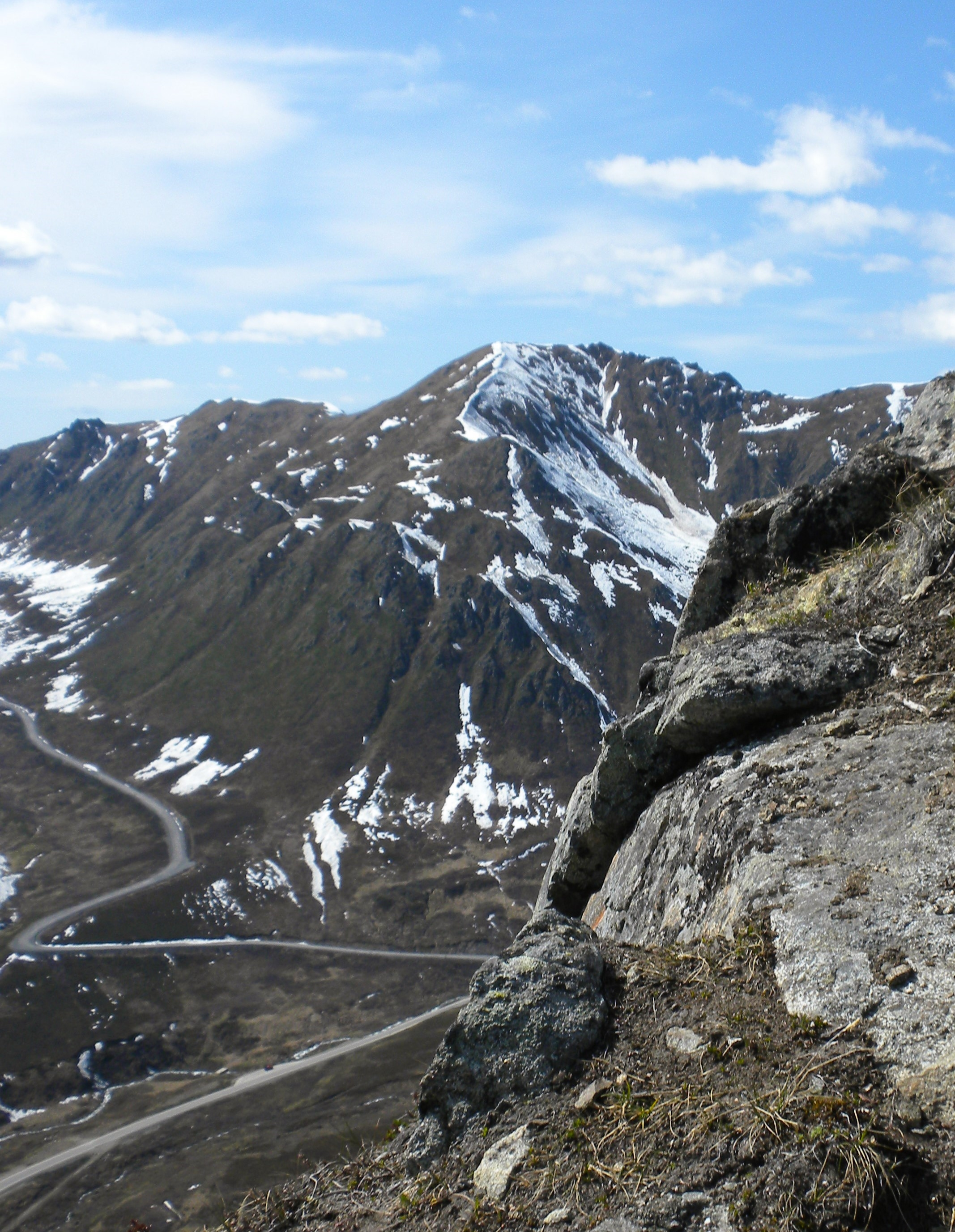
- East aspect

Highest point
- Elevation: 4,784 ft (1,458 m)
- Prominence: 225 ft (69 m)
- Parent peak: Bullion Mountain
- Isolation: 1.24 mi (2.00 km)
- Coordinates: 61°46′45″N 149°18′09″W

Geography
- Location within Alaska
- Interactive map of Skyscraper Mountain
- Country: United States
- State: Alaska
- Borough: Matanuska-Susitna
- Parent range: Talkeetna Mountains
- Topo map: USGS Anchorage D-7

Climbing
- Easiest route: Trail

Skyscraper Mountain is a 4,784-foot-elevation (1,458-meter) summit in Alaska, United States.

== Description ==
Skyscraper Mountain is located 14 miles (22.5 km) northwest of Palmer, Alaska, in the Talkeetna Mountains, on land managed as the Hatcher Pass Management Area of the state park system. It is also immediately north of Hatcher Pass and southwest of the Independence Mine State Historic Park. Precipitation runoff from this mountain's east slope drains to the nearby Little Susitna River via Fishhook Creek, whereas the west side drains to the Susitna River via Willow Creek. Topographic relief is significant as the summit rises 1,780 feet (543 meters) above Fishhook Creek in 0.8 miles (1.3 km). Access is via the Palmer-Fishhook Road (also called Hatcher Pass Road), and a 2.2-mile trail (round-trip) gains 1,170 feet of elevation to reach the summit. The Martin Mine located on the mountain's northeast slope was the site of the first gold quartz discovery in the Willow Creek mining district made in 1906 by Robert Lee Hatcher (1867–1950), and it produced 27,150 ounces of gold from 1906 to 1931. This mountain's descriptive toponym has been officially adopted by the United States Board on Geographic Names as reported in 1942 by U.S. Geological Survey, however the name has been in publications since at least 1914.

== Geology ==
The Willow Creek mining district at Hatcher Pass is historically the third-largest lode-gold producing district in Alaska, having produced 624,000 ounces of gold. Mining of placer gold deposits began in 1906. Hardrock gold mining began a few years later from high-grade vein lode deposits.

The Willow Creek mining district lies at the southwestern edge of a great mass of granitic intrusions that form much of the Talkeetna Mountains and is within the Wrangellia composite terrane. At Hatcher Pass a pervasively altered zoned 74 million years old quartz diorite to tonalite pluton underlies the headwaters of Willow Creek and Fishhook Creek, with most of the gold deposits occurring in these rocks. A 67 Ma quartz monzonite pluton lies west and north of the older quartz diorite; a Cretaceous quartz diorite pluton lies to the east. South of Bullion Mountain, a high angle east–west fault passing through Hatcher Pass separates plutonic rocks on the north side of the fault from schist south of the fault.

== Climate ==
Based on the Köppen climate classification, Skyscraper Mountain is located in a subarctic climate zone with long, cold, snowy winters, and short cool summers. Winter temperatures can drop below 0 °F with wind chill factors below −10 °F. The months of May through June offer the most favorable weather for climbing or viewing.

== Gallery ==
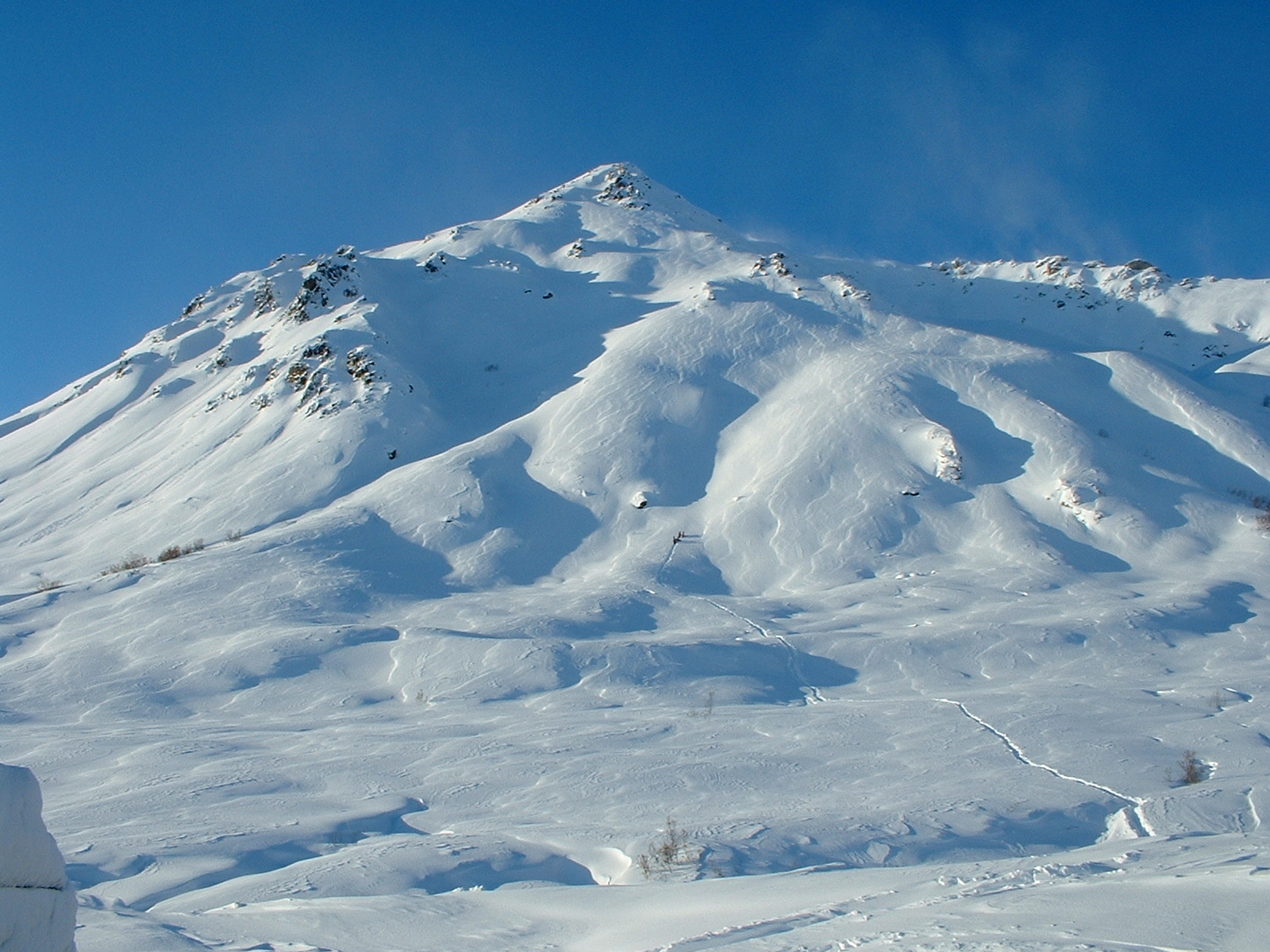
East ridge in winter

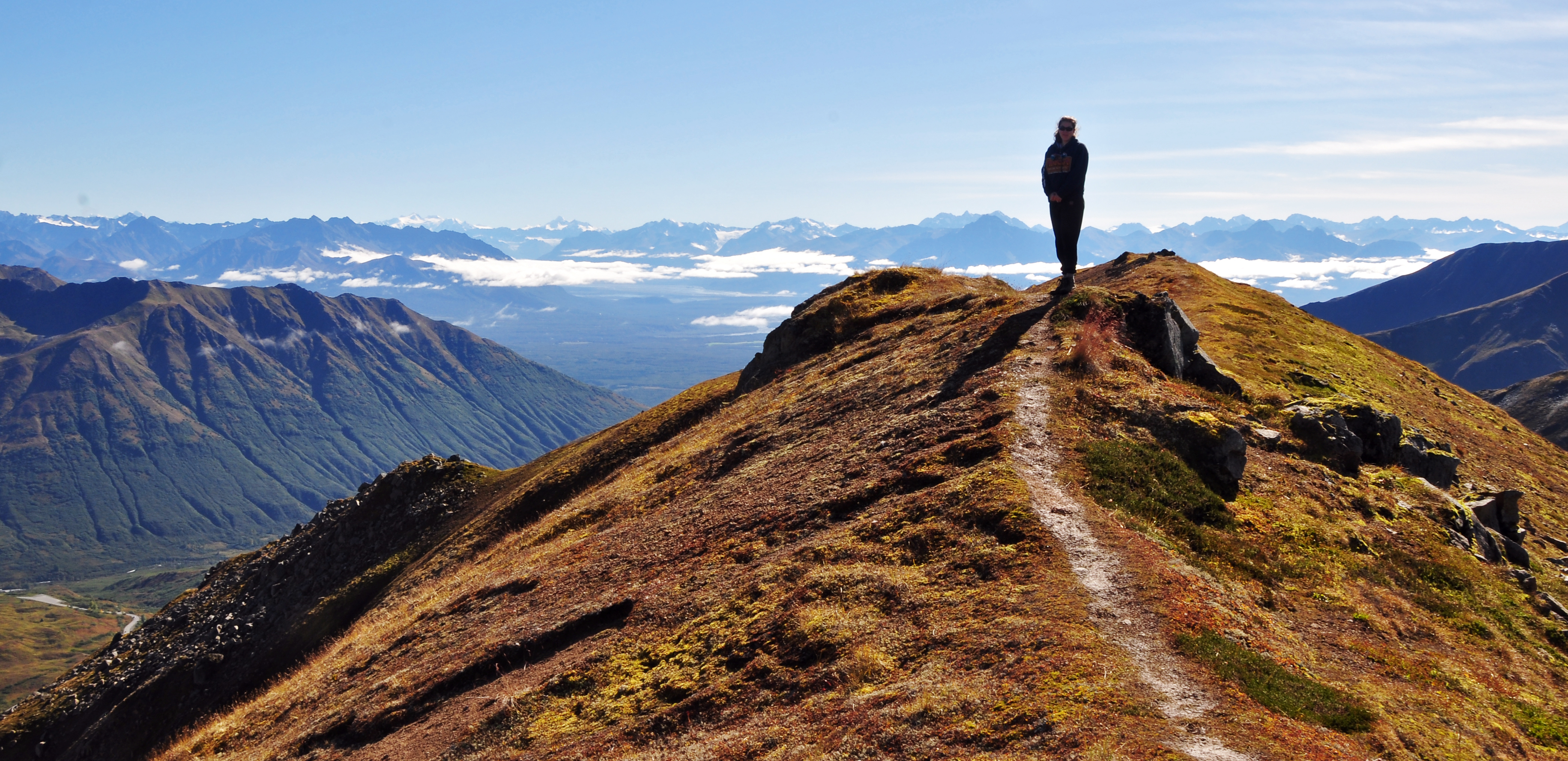
Summit of Skyscraper Mountain, camera pointed south

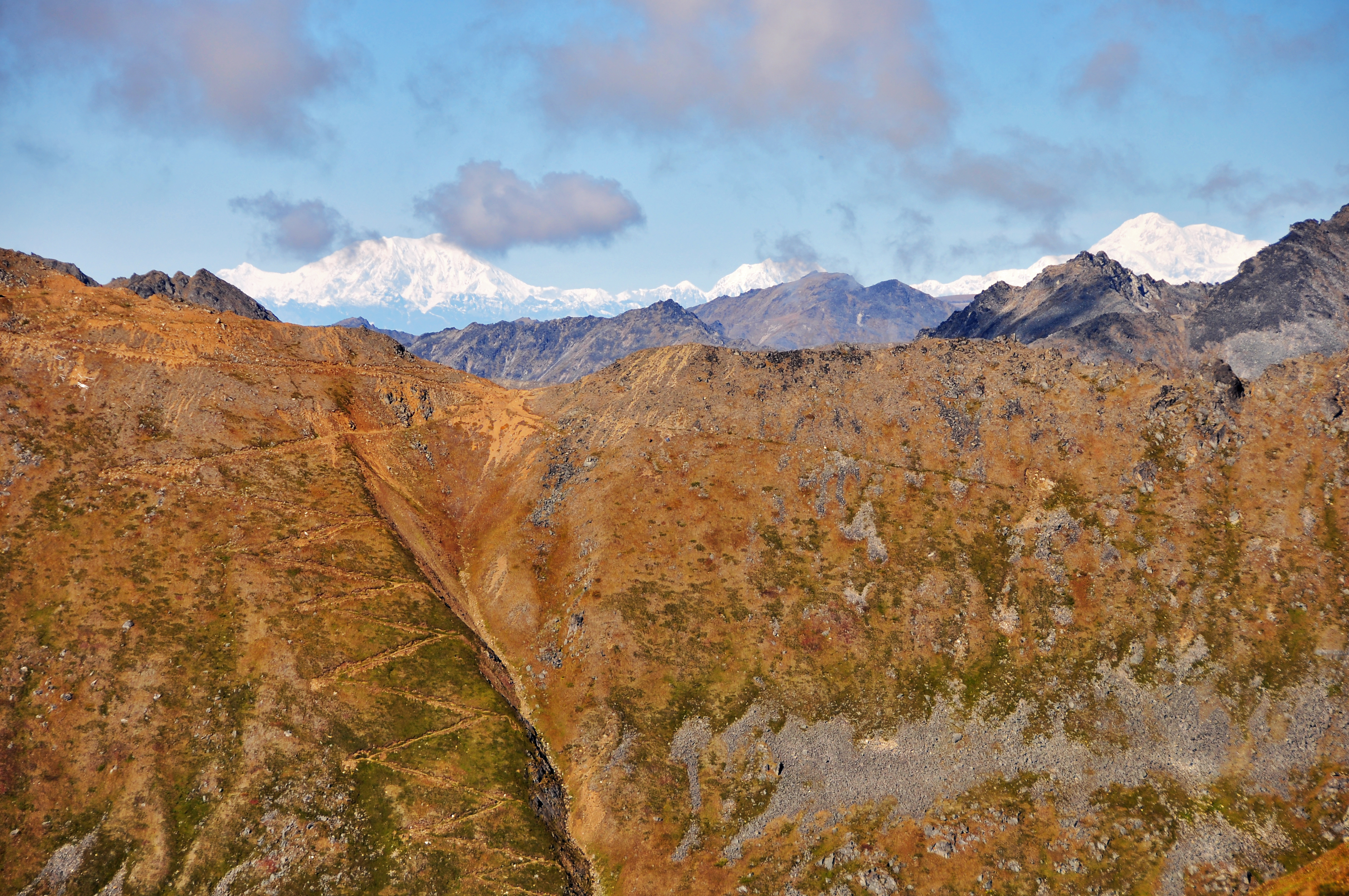
View from Skyscraper Mountain. On the horizon are Mount Foraker and Denali. The reddish ridge with switchbacks is part of Bullion Mountain.

== See also ==
- Geography of Alaska
