= Government (disambiguation) =

Government is the system or group of people governing an organized community, often a state.

Government may also refer to:

- Administration (government)
- Executive (government) (in parliamentary systems)
- Ministry (collective executive)
- Governance
- Government (linguistics), the relationship between a word and its dependents

== See also ==
- List of governments
- Gov (disambiguation)
- Governor
- Government Peak
- The Guvernment
