= Willow Creek mining district =

- Alaska Mining District
- Location within Alaska
- Coordinates: 61°47′N 149°15′W

The Willow Creek mining district, also known as the Independence Mine/Hatcher Pass district, is a gold-mining area in the U.S. state of Alaska. Underground hard-rock mining of gold from quartz veins accounts for most of the mineral wealth extracted from the Hatcher Pass area. The first mining efforts were placer mining of stream gravels, and placer mining in the area has continued sporadically to this day. Robert Hatcher discovered gold and staked the first claim in the Willow Creek valley in September 1906. The first lode mill in the area started operating in 1908. Underground mining continued at a variety of locations around the pass until 1951. In the 1980s one of the area's hard-rock mines was briefly re-opened. At least one mining company is actively exploring for gold in the area now. Through 2006 the district produced 667-thousand ounces of hard rock gold and 60-thousand ounces of placer gold.

The Willow Creek district at Hatcher Pass is historically the third-largest lode-gold producing district in Alaska, having produced 624,000 oz of gold. At Hatcher Pass proper the southwestern margin of the Cretaceous to Tertiary age Talkeetna Mountains batholith is in fault contact with a pelitic schist. The Talkeetna Mountains batholith in this area consists of a pervasively altered zoned 74 Ma (million years old) tonalite body underlying Hatcher Pass and the headwaters of Willow Creek, and a 67 Ma quartz monzonite pluton farther west. The schist to the south consists mainly of metamorphosed and deformed sedimentary rocks, of Late Cretaceous to Paleocene age. The schist may represent subducted Valdez Group that was exhumed in the forearc region from beneath the Peninsular terrane. Both deformed and undeformed small felsic dikes occur in the schist. Several bodies of serpentinite are contained within the schist. Unmetamorphosed Late Cretaceous or Tertiary terrestrial sedimentary rocks of the Arkose Ridge Formations lie to the south of the schist and intrusives, across a low-angle detachment fault. Those bedded rocks are derived from the schists and intrusive rocks to the north. A rock unit variously mapped as intricately intermixed amphibolite and quartz diorite; or as a migmatite, occurs in contact with the Arkose Ridge formation on Government Peak and in contact with the Arkose Ridge Formation and quartz monzonite east of the Little Susitna River. It is not clear if the migmatite is a higher-metamorphic-grade equivalent of the schist.

Gold-bearing (+/- Ag, W, Sb, As, Cu, Mo, Pb, Te, Zn, Hg) veins occur in the tonalite, in small amounts in the schist, and in the Jurassic? migmatite, but not in the western quartz monzonite or in the Tertiary sediments. Most of the mineral deposits are close to the tonalite-schist contact.

== Independence mine ==
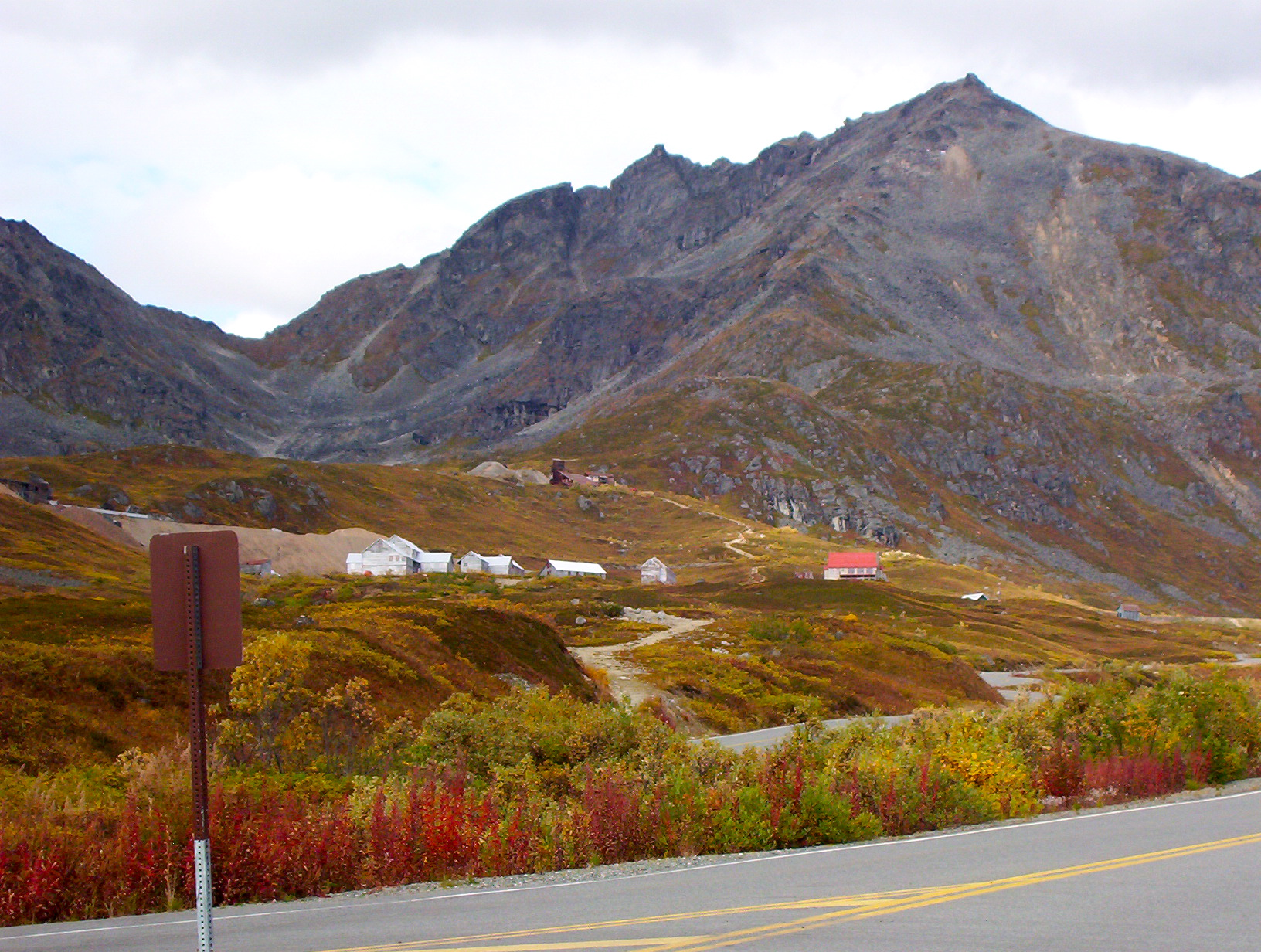
Independence Mine is now a State Historic Park

What is now called Independence Mine was once two mines: The Alaska Free Gold Mine on Skyscraper Mountain, and Independence Mine on Granite Mountain. In 1938 the two were brought together under one company, the Alaska-Pacific Consolidated Mining Company (APC). With a block of 83 mining claims, APC became the largest producer in the Willow Creek Mining District. The claims covered more than 1,350 acres (5.5 km^{2}) and included 27 structures. In its peak year, 1941, APC employed 204 men, blasted nearly a dozen miles of tunnels, and produced about 35,000 ounces of gold.

In 1942, the War Production Board designated gold mining as nonessential to the war effort. Gold mining throughout the United States came to a halt, but Independence Mine was permitted to continue to operate because of the presence of scheelite, an ore of the "strategic mineral" tungsten, which occurs in the quartz lode with the gold. In 1943, Independence Mine was ordered to close. Mining interests returned to Hatchers Pass when gold prices rose in the mid-1970s; this resulted in a short period of production from the Independence Mine in 1982 by Coronado Mining Company.

Today, Independence Mine is a part of the Independence Mine State Historical Park, a popular winter recreation area. Displays of mining artifacts may also be viewed at the Dorothy Page Museum and Old Wasilla Townsite in downtown Wasilla, Alaska.

The Independence was the largest mine in the Willow Creek District, over a dozen other hard rock mines operated, and may operate again, within a few miles.

== Willow Creek mines ==
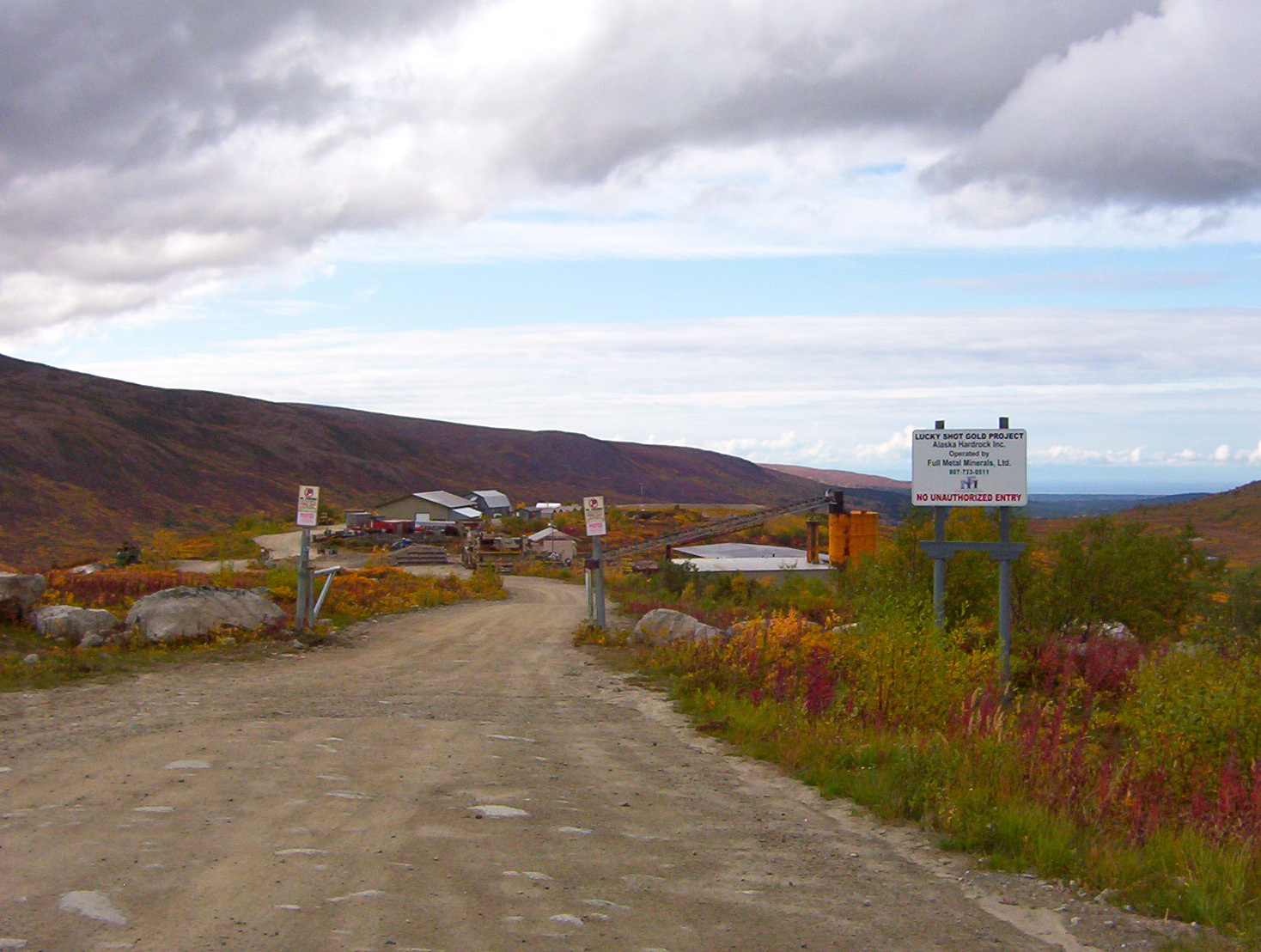
Entrance to Lucky Shot Mine

The Willow Creek Mines includes the Lucky Shot mine (Gold, copper, lead, zinc, arsenic) and War Baby mine (Gold, copper) veins, which produced from veins cutting the igneous country rock. Combined production for the two mines between 1919 and 1940 was about 252,000 ounces of gold, with some copper. Grade was about 2.2 ounces of gold per ton.

== Other Notable Lode-Gold mines of the District ==
The Gold Bullion Mine (Gold, copper, mercury), produced about 77,000 ounces of gold, at a grade of 1.7 ounces per ton, from quartz veins in igneous rock.

The Fern Mine (Gold, lead, tungsten, tellurium), produced about 44,000 ounces of gold between 1922 and 1950 from quartz veins in shears in igneous rock.

The Martin Mine (Gold, copper, lead), produced about 28,000 ounces of gold from two veins between 1911 and 1920, at an average grade of 1 ounce per ton.

The Gold Cord Mine (Gold, copper, lead, zinc, tungsten), produced about 16,000 ounces of gold, mainly between 1931 and 1938, from veins with grades ranging for 0.1 to 9 ounces per ton.

== See also ==
- Gold mining in Alaska
