= Susitna Flats State Game Refuge =

Game preserve in Alaska, USA

Coordinates: 61°24′22″N 150°25′32″W

The Susitna Flats State Game Refuge is a game preserve in the U.S. state of Alaska. Each year approximately 10 percent of the waterfowl harvest in the state of Alaska occurs on Susitna Flats, with about 15,000 ducks and over 500 geese taken. Many hunters land float planes on one of the numerous lakes on the flats. Other hunters cross the inlet by boat to enjoy their hunt.

== Birds ==
Perhaps the most spectacular feature of the Susitna Flats State Game Refuge — and certainly the prime reason for its refuge status — is the spring and fall concentration of migrating waterfowl and shorebirds. Usually by mid-April, mallards, pintails, and Canada geese are present in large numbers. Peak densities are reached in early May when as many as 100,000 waterfowl are using the refuge to feed, rest, and conduct their final courtship prior to nesting. The refuge also hosts several thousand lesser sandhill cranes and upwards of 8,000 swans. Northern phalaropes, dowitchers, godwits, whimbrels, snipe, yellowlegs, sandpipers, plovers, and dunlin are among the most abundant of shorebirds. Most of the ducks, geese, and shorebirds move north or west to nest in other areas of the state. About 10,000 ducks — mostly mallards, pintails, and green-winged teal — remain to nest in the coastal fringe of marsh ponds and sedge meadows found in the refuge. Recently, Tule geese, a subspecies of the greater white-fronted goose, have been discovered to nest and stage on Susitna Flats. In the fall, migrant waterfowl and shorebirds once again arrive in growing numbers to rest and feed on sedge meadows, marshes, and intertidal mud flats.

== Mammals ==
Back from the coast are brushy thickets where moose calve each spring. In the winter, moose from surrounding uplands return to the refuge to find food and relief from deep snow. Both brown and black bears use the refuge, feeding particularly on early spring vegetation near salt marshes and sedge meadows. Beaver, mink, otter, muskrat, coyote, and wolf can also be found. Trapping is a regular winter activity on the refuge.

Several hundred white beluga whales concentrate in an area extending from the Little Susitna River to the Beluga River, between late May and June. The beluga gather in these nearshore waters to calve, breed, and feed on the large runs of eulachon (“hooligan”) fish that return to spawn in the Susitna River.

== Fish ==
The Susitna River and its tributaries support the second largest salmon-producing system within Cook Inlet. In the summer, set net fishing sites dot the shoreline of the refuge.

An impressive 40,000 user-days of sport fishing effort are expended on the Little Susitna River each year, reached over land on a rough 4-wheel drive trail. Some hardy fishermen head for the Little Susitna by boat from the mouth of Ship Creek.

The Theodore and Lewis rivers are popular fly-in fishing streams for king salmon from late May through June. Combined, these rivers annually provide approximately 7,000 user-days fishing effort and a harvest of 1,000 king salmon.

== See also ==
- Little Susitna River Public Use Area, a park operated for ADF&G by Alaska State Parks that provide access to the Refuge
- Alaska Department of Fish and Game
