= Skeetawk =

Nonprofit ski area in Matanuska-Susitna Borough, Alaska, United States

- Interactive map of Skeetawk
- Location: Hatcher Pass
- Nearest city: Palmer; 13.5 mi (21.7 km) south
- Coordinates: 61°44′33.6″N 149°13′50.5″W
- Vertical: 300

Skeetawk is a nonprofit ski area in the Matanuska-Susitna Borough of Alaska. After 40 years of community proposals to build a downhill ski area in the Hatcher Pass region, ground was broken in 2020. Its first lift, a triple chair, became operational in June of that year, with plans to add a high-speed lift by 2029. Skeetawk played host to the alpine skiing and snowboarding events in the 2024 Arctic Winter Games. It was named after the Athabaskan word Shk’ituk’t, meaning ‘the place where we slide down’.
