= Government Peak =

Mountain in Alaska, United States

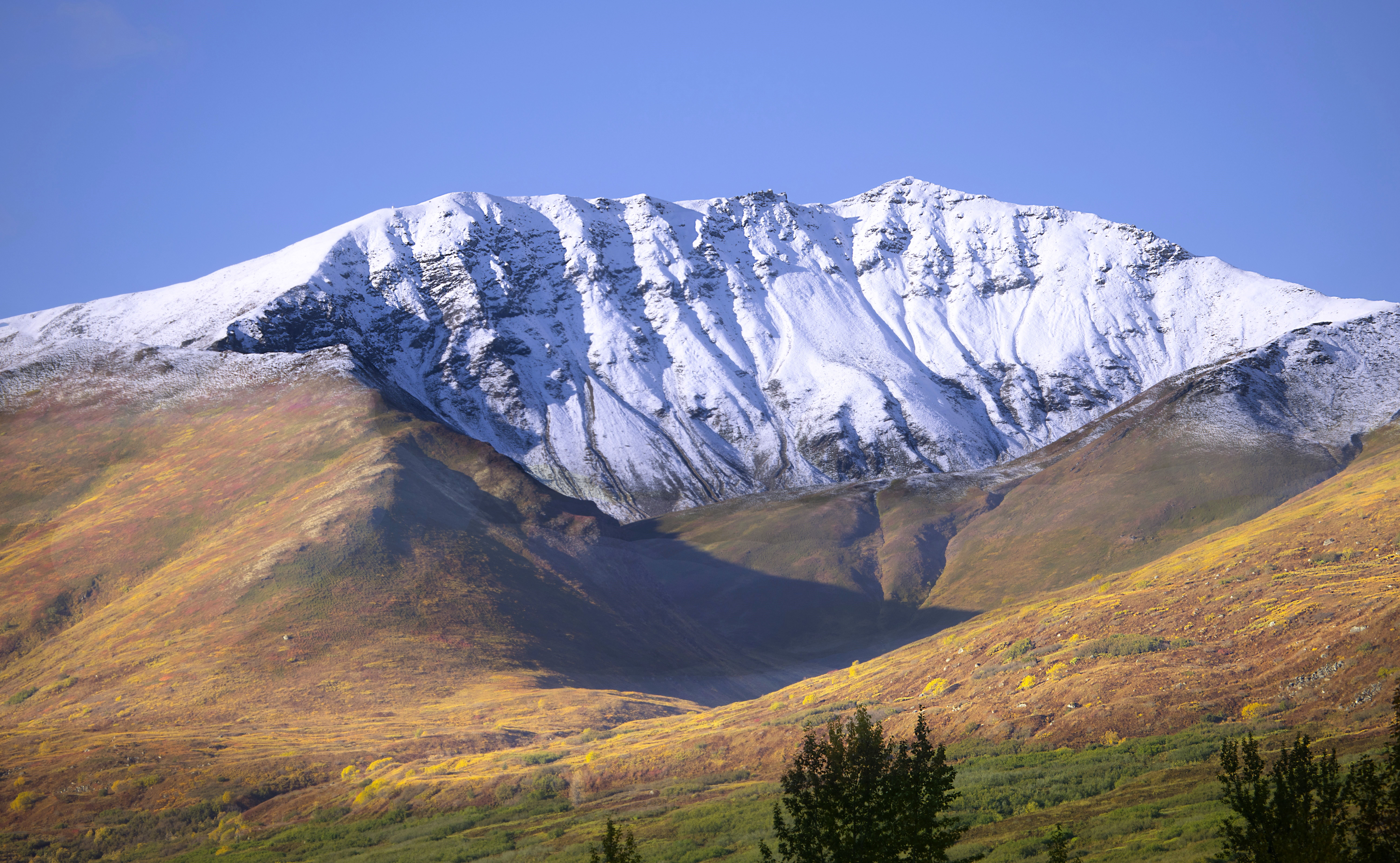
- Northeast aspect

Highest point
- Elevation: 4,781 ft (1,457 m)
- Prominence: 450 ft (137 m)
- Parent peak: Bald Mountain Ridge
- Isolation: 0.93 mi (1.50 km)
- Coordinates: 61°44′02″N 149°18′05″W

Geography
- Location within Alaska
- Interactive map of Government Peak
- Country: United States
- State: Alaska
- Borough: Matanuska-Susitna
- Parent range: Talkeetna Mountains
- Topo map: USGS Anchorage C-7

Government Peak is a 4,781-foot-elevation (1,457-meter) summit in Alaska, United States.

== Description ==
Government Peak is located 11 miles (17.75 km) northwest of Palmer, Alaska, in the Talkeetna Mountains, on land managed as the Hatcher Pass East Management Area of the state park system. Government Peak Recreation Area lies at the southern foot of the mountain. Precipitation runoff from this mountain drains to the nearby Little Susitna River. Topographic relief is significant as the summit rises 3,580 feet (1,091 meters) above the river in 2.25 miles (3.62 km). Access is via the Palmer-Fishhook Road (also called Hatcher Pass Road), and a 6.5-mile trail (round-trip) gains 3,800 feet of elevation to reach the summit. This mountain's toponym has been officially adopted by the United States Board on Geographic Names as a local name reported in 1939 by U.S. Geological Survey. The mountain is called K'eda Beq'e Nay'uni by the Denaʼina, which translates to "The one that has a horn on it" because caribou horns were found on the slopes.

== Climate ==
Based on the Köppen climate classification, Government Peak is located in a subarctic climate zone with long, cold, snowy winters, and short cool summers. Winter temperatures can drop below 0 °F with wind chill factors below −10 °F. The months of May through June offer the most favorable weather for climbing or viewing.

== Geology ==
North of Government Peak, a high angle east–west fault passing through Hatcher Pass separates plutonic rocks on the north side of the fault from schist south of the fault. The Hatcher Pass schist consists mainly of metamorphosed and deformed sedimentary rocks, of Late Cretaceous to Paleocene age. Both deformed and undeformed small felsic dikes occur in the schist. Several bodies of serpentinite are contained within the schist.

West of Government Peak, the Arkose Ridge Formation lies to the south of the schist and the contact is a low-angle detachment fault. The Arkose Ridge Formation is unmetamorphosed, tilted and slightly folded, and consists of Tertiary sedimentary arkose, shale, sandstone, and conglomerate rocks that are clearly derived from the schists and intrusive rocks to the north. Locally, quartz diorite or gneiss bodies occur on the arkose-schist contact west of Government Peak. Minor basalt flows occur within the Arkose Ridge Formation.

On Government Peak, a 90 Ma (million years old) rock unit variously mapped as gneiss, or as intricately intermixed amphibolite and quartz diorite, or as a migmatite, and most recently as a mafic unit of gabbro and pyroxenite with local foliation and mylonitic textures structurally underlies the Arkose Ridge Formation and outcrops in between the Hatcher Pass schist and the arkose. South-dipping low angle detachment faults separate the units. East of Government Peak and the Little Susitna River the mafic rock unit is in contact with the Arkose Ridge Formation to the south and the felsic plutons to the north.

== See also ==
- Geography of Alaska
