= Gov (disambiguation) =

Gov is short for government.

Gov or GOV may also refer to:

- Governor
- .gov, a top level domain
- Gidi Gov (born 1950), Israeli singer
- Gove Airport, IATA airport code "GOV"
- Goo language, ISO 639 code gov
