= Hatcher Pass =

Mountain pass in Alaska, United States

Coordinates: 61°46′11″N 149°18′32″W

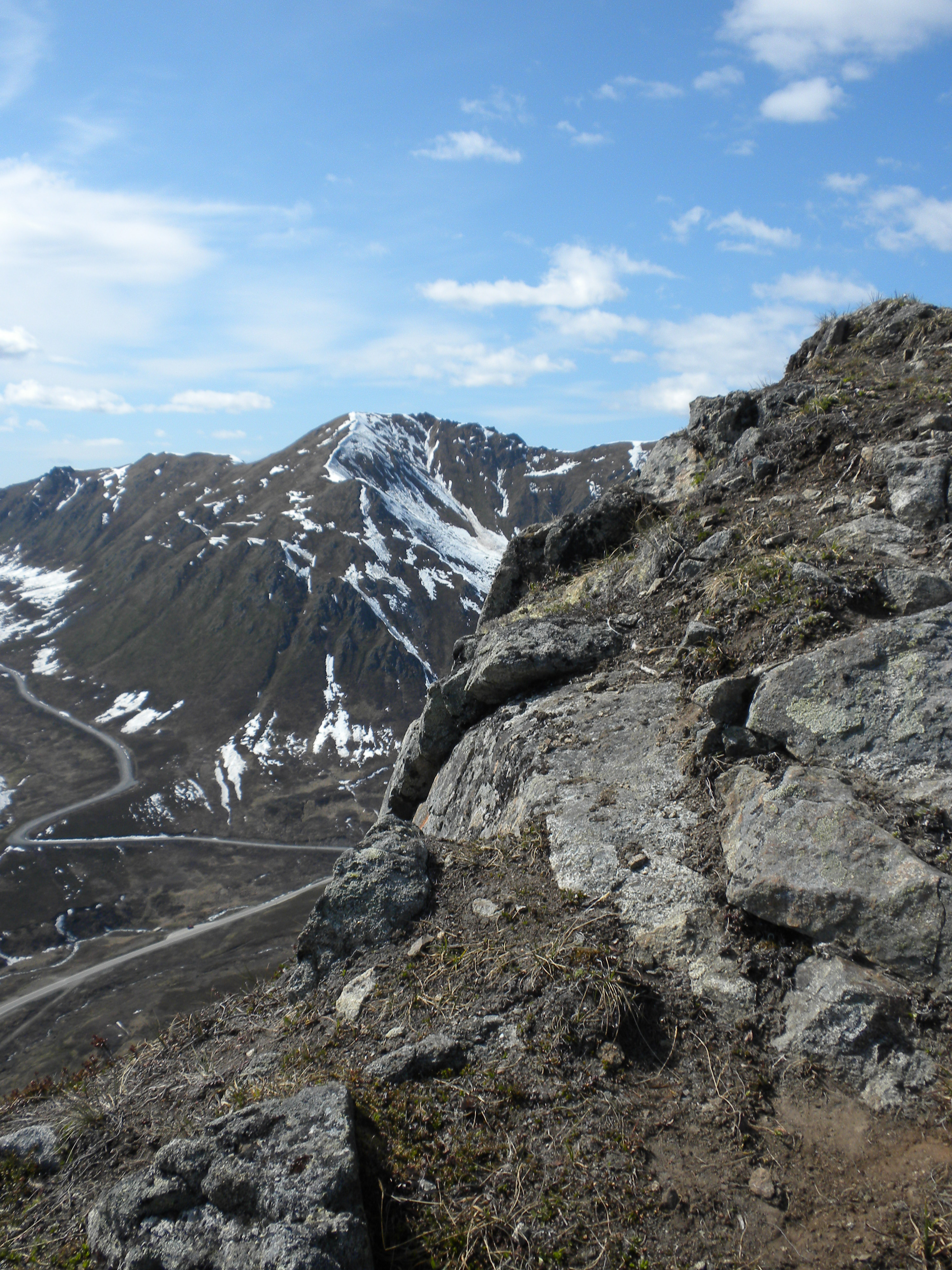
- Interactive map of Hatcher Pass
- Elevation: 3,886 ft (1,184 m)

Third Approach
- Location: Matanuska-Susitna Borough, Alaska, United States
- Range: Talkeetna Mountains

Hatcher Pass (3,886 ft or 1,148 m) is a mountain pass through the southwest part of the Talkeetna Mountains, Alaska. It is named after Robert Hatcher, a prospector and miner. The nearest cities are Palmer and Wasilla approximately 12 miles (19 km) to the south, and Willow approximately 26 mi (42 km) to the west. The communities are at an elevation of approximately 250 ft (76 m) in the Mat-Su valley.

== Overview ==
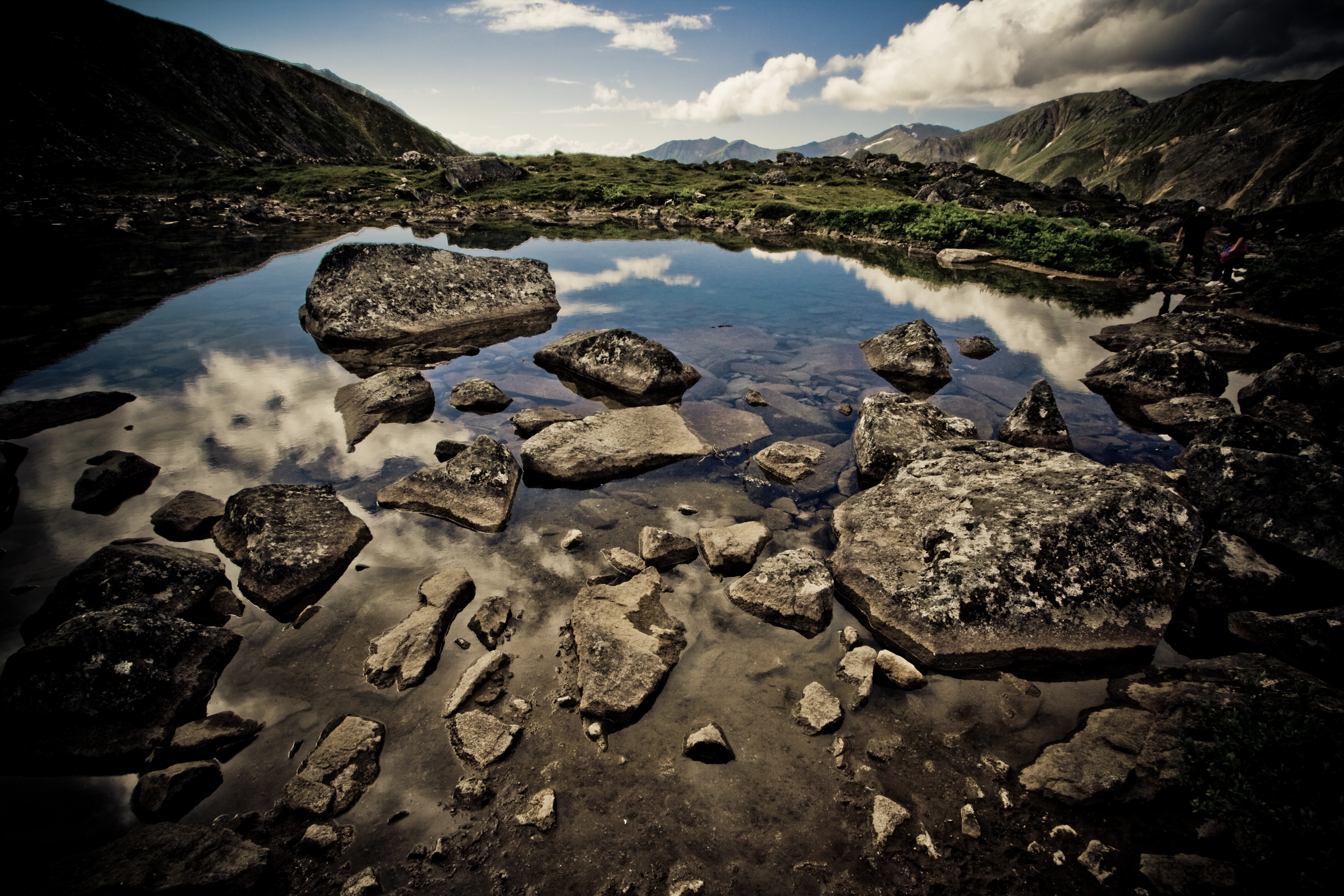
Gold Cord Lake in Hatcher Pass

From the west, the pass is reached from the Parks Highway by a road winding approximately 40 miles (64 km) up the valley of Willow Creek. The pass divides the alpine headwaters of Willow Creek on the west from Fishhook Creek and the Independence Bowl on the east side. To the east the road drops into and follows the Little Susitna River canyon downstream, and south, some dozen miles to the abrupt mountain front at the edge of the broad Matanuska-Susitna Valley. The road is unpaved and minimally maintained for about 20 miles (32 km) over the pass. This central portion of the road is usually closed by snow from late September to July. Although closed to car traffic, this section of road is heavily traveled in winter and spring by snowmachines and skiers.

Mills, adits, sky-trams, and other extensive early-1900s mine workings throughout the area of the pass record the activity that brought the road in. Now only a handful of people live and work in Independence Bowl, and none in the surrounding valleys.

There are no known historical native settlements in the area, although Dena'ina Indians hunted for caribou, sheep, and moose in the western Talkeetna Mountains until the 1930s. Human development in the area, including the road over the pass, is almost entirely due to gold mining.

Almost all the land around the pass is public; there are numerous widely distributed small private land holdings, mainly mineral estates. The area is popular for daytrip recreation; sledding, skiing, snowmobiling, hiking, camping, hunting, white-water kayaking, berry-picking, climbing, recreational gold-mining, mountain biking, etc. Independence Mine State Historic Park, a few miles east of the pass, consists of 271 acres (1.10 km^{2}), with well-preserved mine buildings, and a mining museum which offers underground mine tours. A large tract of land organized as the Hatcher Pass State Management area includes and surrounds the State Park and the pass.

Food and lodging is available at The Hatcher Pass Lodge in Independence Valley.

== Mining ==
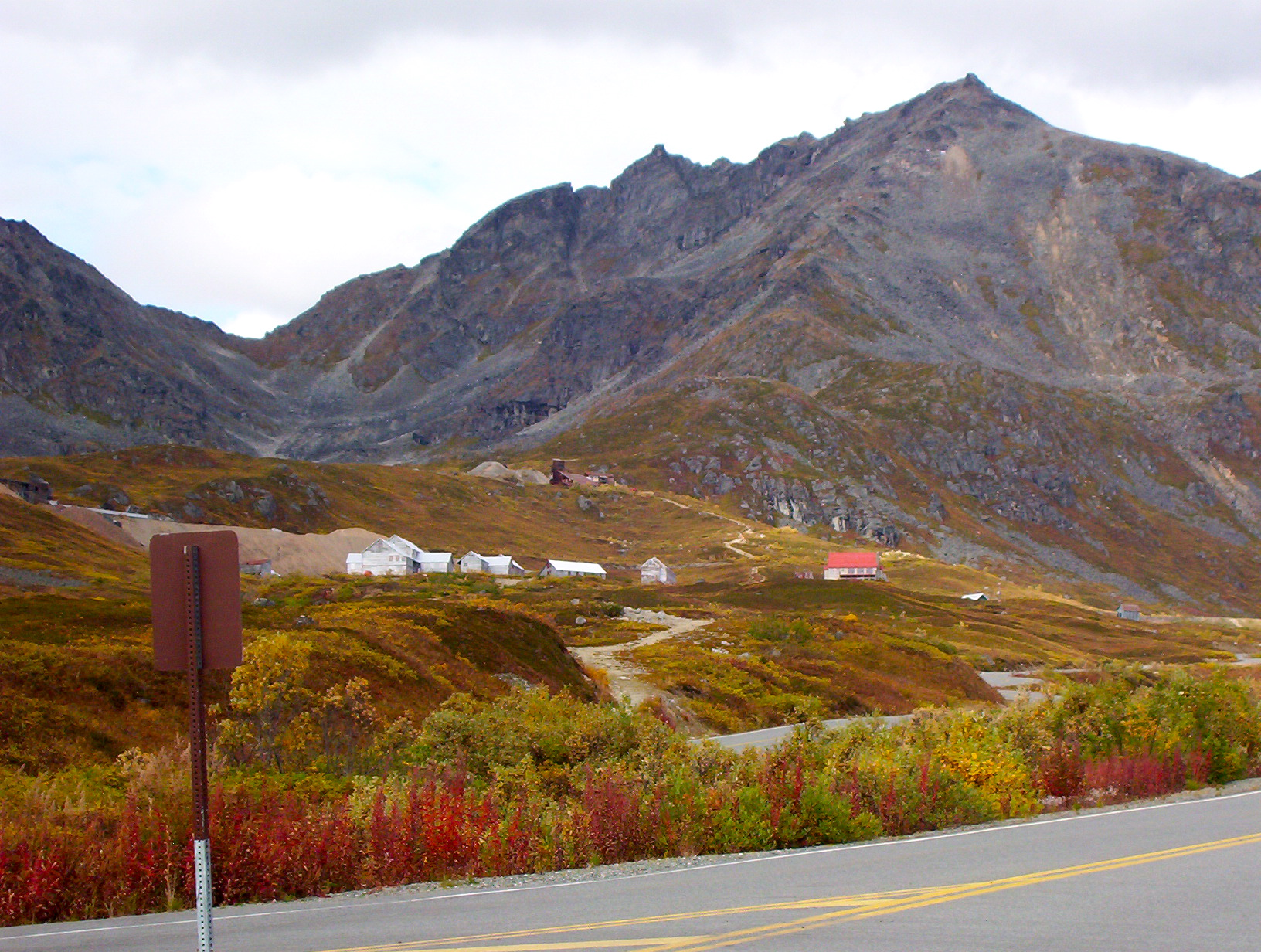
The Independence Mine State Historic Park offers tours in the summer months

The Willow Creek mining district at Hatcher Pass is historically the third-largest lode-gold producing district in Alaska, having produced 624,000 oz of gold. Mining of placer gold deposits began in the Willow Creek mining district in 1906. Hardrock gold mining began a few years later from high-grade vein lode deposits. Placer mining for gold has continued sporadically to this day. Underground mining continued at a variety of locations around the pass until 1951. In the 1980s, one of the area's hard-rock mines was briefly re-opened. At least one mining company is actively exploring for gold in the area now.

== Geography ==
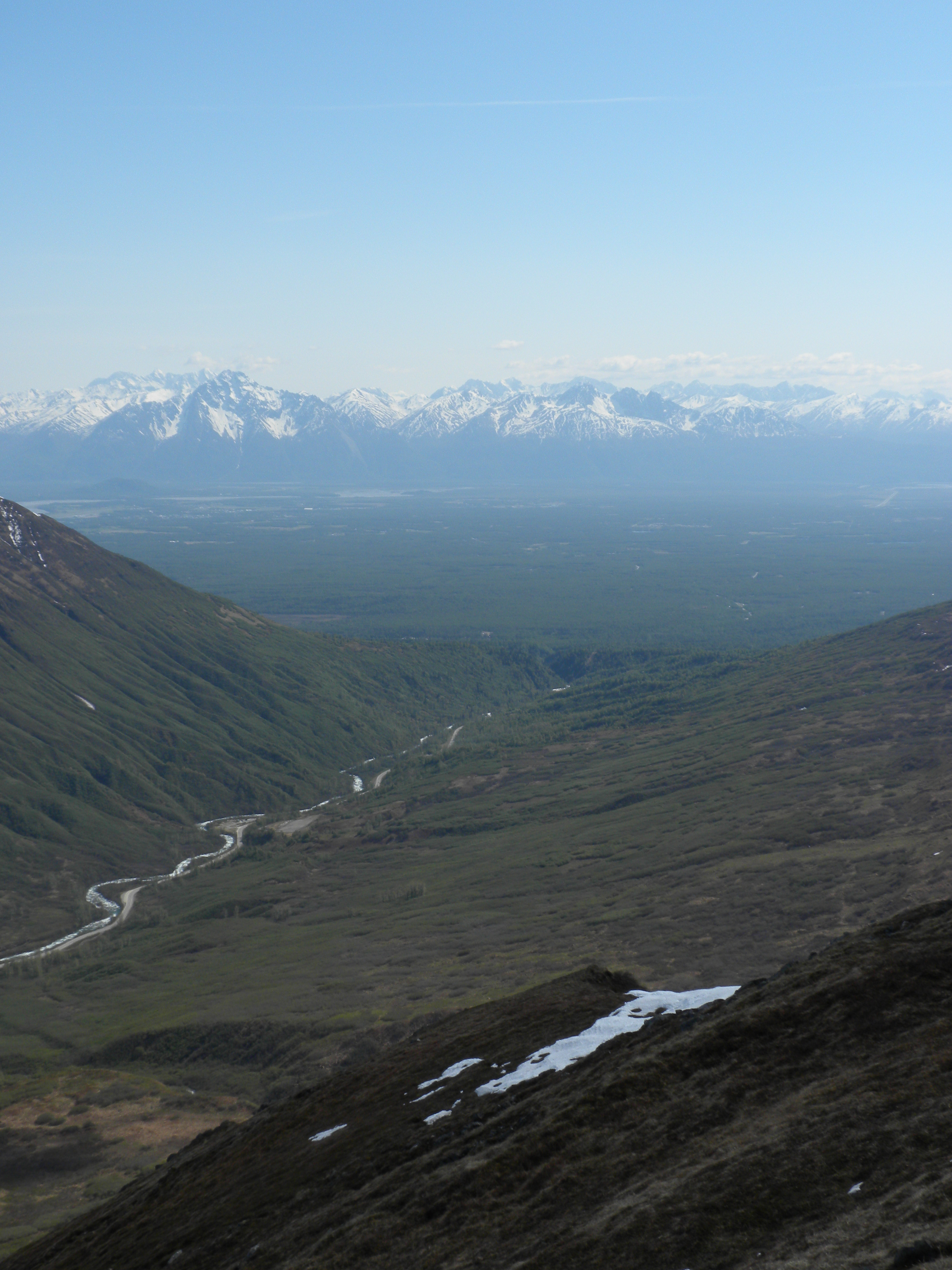
Looking down the Little Su River and across the Matanuska Valley in the Chugach Mountains, from near Hatcher Pass.

The Fishhook Road rises to 3,886 feet (1,184 m) to cross Hatcher Pass at the head of Fishhook and Willow Creeks in the southwestern corner of the Talkeetna Mountains. The area has been heavily glaciated. Steep-walled cirques, jagged aretes, and hanging valleys above U-shaped valleys characterize the terrain. Trees grow only in the lowest valley bottoms. Brush, often dense, grows on lower mountain slopes, yielding to open tundra as elevation increase. Glaciers occupy the headwaters of major drainages. Some nearby peaks are over 6,000 feet (1,800 m) tall.

== Geology ==
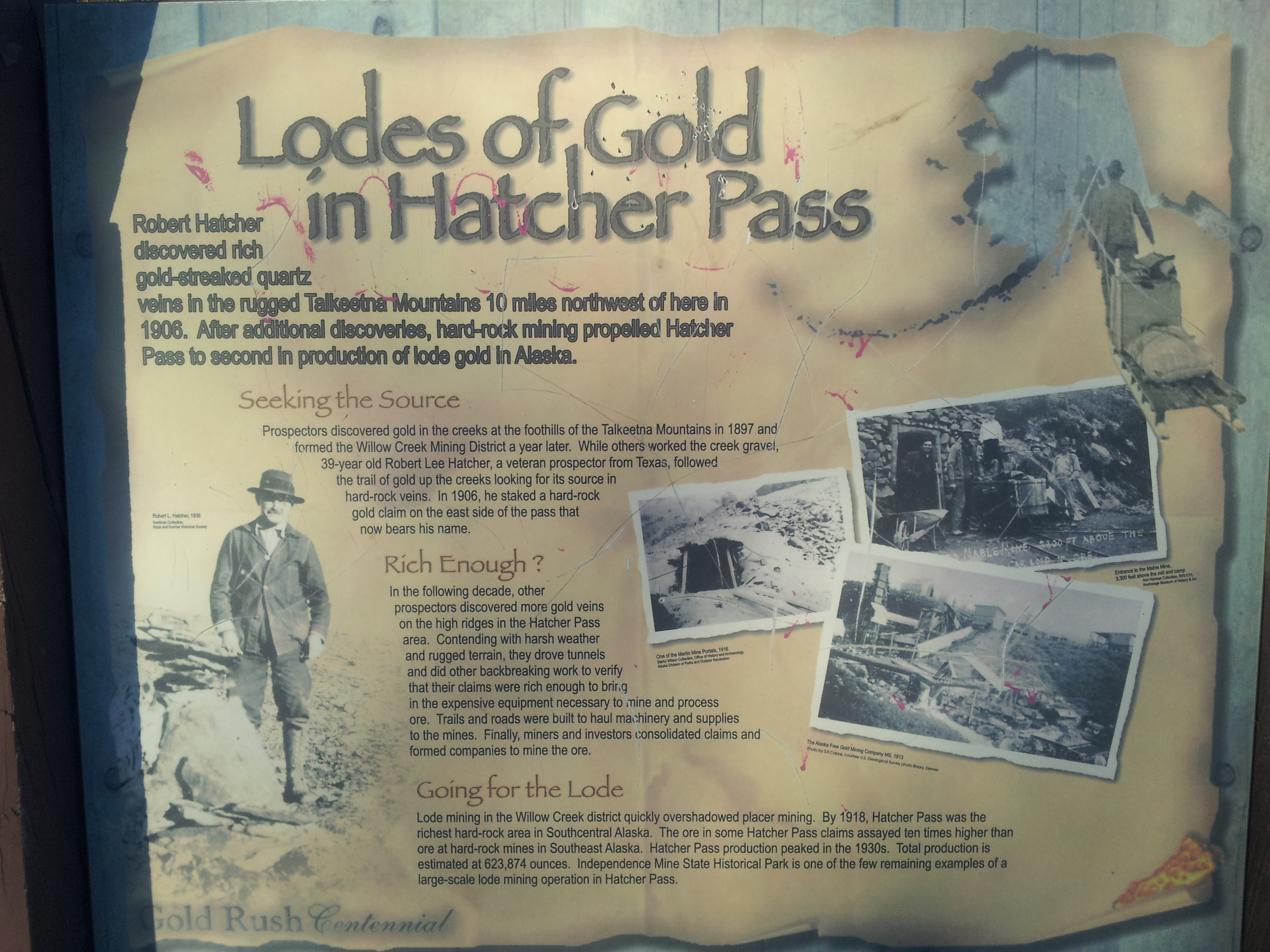
Historical marker developed by Alaska State Parks

The Willow Creek mining district lies at the southwestern edge of a great mass of granitic intrusions that form much of the Talkeetna Mountains. The area is within the Wrangellia composite terrane

At Hatcher Pass a pervasively altered zoned 74 Ma (million years old) quartz diorite to tonalite pluton underlies the headwaters of Willow Creek and Fishhook Creek; most of the gold deposits occur in these rocks. A 67 Ma quartz monzonite pluton lies west and north of the older quartz diorite, a Cretaceous (?) quartz diorite pluton lies to the east.

A high angle east-west fault passing through Hatcher Pass separates the plutonic rocks on the north side of the fault from the Hatcher Pass schist south of the fault. The Hatcher Pass schist consists mainly of metamorphosed and deformed sedimentary rocks, of Late Cretaceous to Paleocene age. The schist may represent subducted Valdez Group that was exhumed in the forearc region from beneath the Peninsular terrane. Both deformed and undeformed small felsic dikes occur in the schist. Several bodies of serpentinite are contained within the schist.

West of Government Peak, the Arkose Ridge Formation lies to the south of the schist, the contact is a low-angle detachment fault. The Arkose Ridge Formation is unmetamorphosed but tilted and slightly folded, and consists of Tertiary (Late Paleocene to middle Eocene) sedimentary arkose, shale, sandstone, and conglomerate rocks that are clearly derived from the schists and intrusive rocks to the north. Locally, quartz diorite or gneiss bodies occur on the arkose-schist contact west of Government Peak. Minor basalt flows occur within the Arkose Ridge Formation.

On Government Peak a 90 mya rock unit variously mapped as gneiss, or as intricately intermixed amphibolite and quartz diorite, or as a migmatite, and most recently as a mafic unit of gabbro and pyroxenite with local foliation and mylonitic textures structurally underlies the Arkose Ridge Formation and outcrops in between the Hatcher Pass schist and the arkose; south-dipping low angle detachment faults separate the units. East of Government Peak and the Little Susitna River the mafic rock unit is in contact with the Arkose Ridge Formation to the south and the felsic plutons to the north.

Gold-bearing (+/- Ag, W, Sb, As, Cu, Mo, Pb, Te, Zn, Hg) veins and shear zones occur in the 74 Ma (million years old) quartz diorite, in small amounts in the schist and in the mafic unit, but not in the 67Ma quartz monzonite, and in only one instance in the Tertiary sediments. The gold occurrences in the schist, mafic unit, and sediments have much higher silver contents than the deposits in the quartz diorite. Most of the mineral deposits are close to the quartz diorite-schist contact.

The Castle Mountain Fault is a major tectonic feature. It strikes ENE and passes a few miles south of Hatcher Pass. It can be clearly seen crossing the Hatcher Pass road where concrete barriers and fencing protect the road from rockfall of the "incompetent" rocks on the fault trace. Studies show that magnitude 7 earthquakes can be expected to occur on this fault with approximately a 700-year recurrence interval. The last big earthquake was probably 650 years ago.

== Recreational activities ==
Most of the pass is inside the Hatcher Pass East Special Management Area, which encompasses 75,000 acres (30,000 ha) of wilderness. Summit Lake State Recreation Site is a small alpine park with a shallow cirque lake and excellent views. The park is a favorite launch site for paragliders.

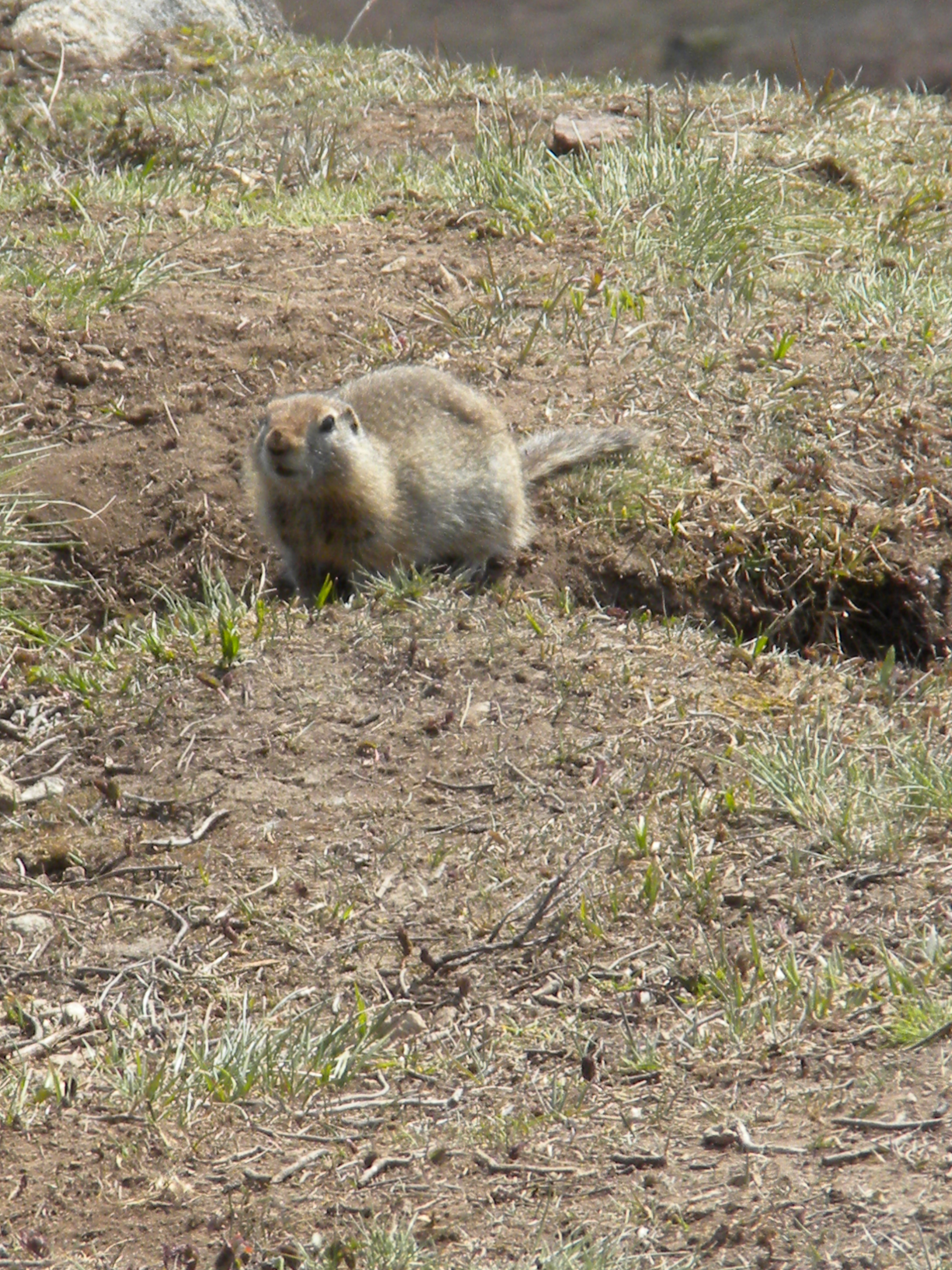
An Arctic ground squirrel at Hatcher Pass

Activities that can be enjoyed in the Hatcher Pass area include Nordic skiing, downhill skiing, mountain climbing, white water kayaking, rock climbing, mountain biking, paragliding, berry picking, gold mining, hiking, kite-flying, snowboarding, wildlife viewing and back country camping. Hatcher Pass Road is a good paved biking trail until Mile 17, where the road changes to gravel.

=== Mountain biking ===
The Gold Mint Trail provides miles of technical, rocky, gently-climbing mountain bike riding alongside the Little Susitna River. The "16 Mile" trail is a steep downhill, 2-mile long (3 km) bike trail with 1,000 vertical feet (300 m) of drop that was built in 2013, in between switchbacks of the Hatcher Pass road, starting at mile 16 of the Hatcher Pass Road. At Government Peak Recreational Area, a few miles (several km) south of Hatcher Pass, there are 5.5 miles (8.9 km) in three loops of singletrack, bermed, flow-style bike trails.

=== Skiing ===
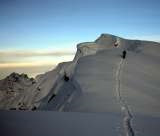
A backcountry ski run at Marmot Mountain

The area has a rich skiing heritage. Historic photos show miners recreating on skis. In the 1930s, Anchorage skiers were bused to the Fishhook Inn to use the rope tow there. That was only one of several small rope-tow ski lifts that have operated near the pass over the years up to the 1960s, although only traces of them can be found now. In 2005 the Mat-Su Borough extended the electric grid and built a short access road to the proposed site of a base lodge. In 2020, after 40 years of proposals from locals, a downhill ski area known as Skeetawk was built in the area, allowing access to Hatcher Pass for novice skiers for the first time. The first lift, a triple chair, was installed the same year, with plans to expand further.

The pass is one of the most popular road-accessible backcountry skiing areas in the state. Usually, it is the first urban-accessible area of Alaska to get skiable snow in the fall. The backcountry alpine skiing season generally extends from late September to late April. Groomed skate and diagonal skiing trails winding amongst historical mining facilities in the high alpine area near the Hatcher Pass Lodge and the museum have a season that typically extends from October to April.

The first 10 kilometers of a Nordic ski area in the forests and glades at Government Peak Recreation Area at the base of Government Peak were opened in December 2012, and a chalet was built in 2013. Additional trails and trail lighting are scheduled to be installed in 2016.

Snowmachines are prohibited within large areas of the Hatcher Pass State Management Area that are frequented by skiers. There are several backcountry huts in the area; a wilderness loop can be traveled over the mountain passes and glaciers linking these huts.
