= Little Susitna River =

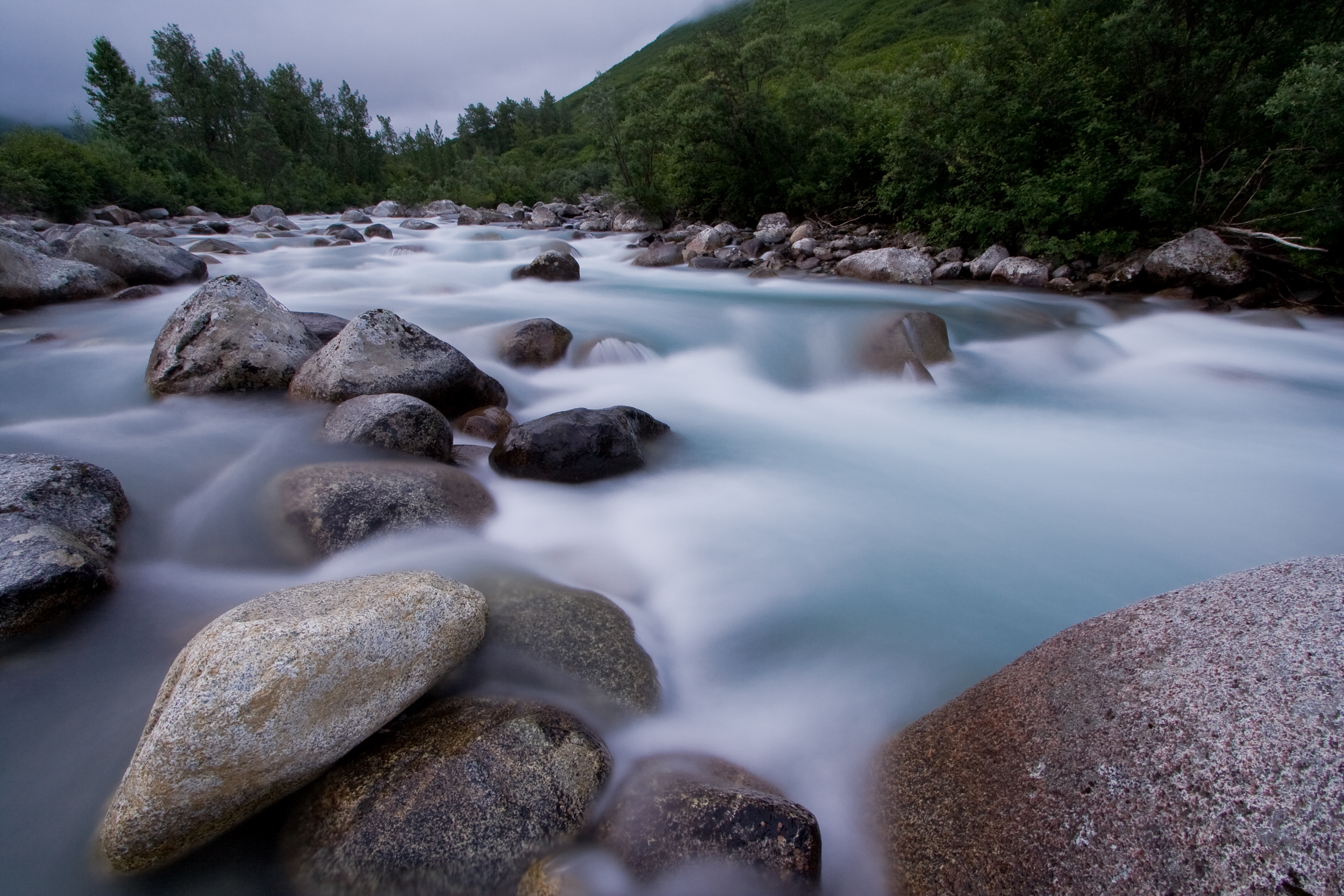
- Little Susitna River

- Location of the mouth of the Little Susitna River in Alaska
- Native name: Tsałtastnu (Denaʼina)

Location
- Country: United States
- State: Alaska

Physical characteristics
- Source
  - location: Mint Glacier on Montana Peak in Talkeetna Mountains
  - coordinates: 61°51′31″N 149°03′48″W
  - elevation: 1,700 ft (520 m)
- Mouth
  - location: Cook Inlet of Pacific Ocean
  - coordinates: 61°15′03″N 150°17′17″W
  - elevation: 0 ft (0 m)
- Length: 110 mi (180 km)
- Basin size: 61.9 sq mi (160 km^{2}) at the Palmer gauge
- Discharge
  - average: 206 cu ft/s (5.8 m^{3}/s)

Little Susitna River (Dena'ina: Tsałtastnu) heads at Mint Glacier on Montana Peak, in Talkeetna Mountains at 61°51′30″N 149°03′30″W, flows southwest to Cook Inlet, 13 miles (21 km) west of Anchorage, Alaska Cook Inlet Low.

== History ==
Local name published in 1898 by USC&GS.

== Location ==
(1334) Little Susitna River, 9 miles (14 km) West of Point MacKenzie, is said to be navigable for landing craft and skiffs at high water for about 8 miles (13 km).

(1335) Caution: the depths offshore and in the approach to Little Susitna River are subject to drastic and continual change.

The Little Susitna River is a river in Alaska. It originates in Hatcher Pass, at 1,700 feet (520 m), in the Talkeetna Mountains which form the northern boundary of the Matanuska-Susitna Valley. It flows a few dozen miles to the Cook Inlet. It contains a variety of hydrology ranging from flat water near the inlet to class 5 water in Hatcher Pass. It is bridged by Fishook Road in Hatcher Pass, Edgerton Parks Road, Welch Road, George Parks Highway, Sushanna Road, and Schrock Road. It flooded in 1972 and again in August 2006, and September 2012 reaching a volume of over 4,500 cubic feet per second (130 m^{3}/s), causing minor damage to homes and infrastructure. It is fed by the mint glacier, Archangel Creek, Fishhook Creek, Government Creek, Nurse Creek, Mary Creek, Swiftwater creek, and numerous other unnamed streams. Popular activities along the river include camping, fishing, wildlife viewing and photography, and hunting.

== Access ==
The river begins in Hatcher Pass, a state recreation area that was originally opened by hard rock mining. This area still has active gold mines and is also open for recreational mining. Much of the land between Hatcher Pass and the George Parks Highway bridge is privately owned, while most of the land below the George Parks Highway Bridge is owned by the state. The George Parks Highway crosses the river at RM 69.5 and parallels the river for about a mile (1.6 km). 42 river miles down stream there is the Little Susitna Public Use Facility, which offers camping and boating access approximately 26 miles (42 km) south of Wasilla. This campground/boat launch lies within the Susitna Flats State Game Refuge on the pristine Little Susitna River.

There are 3 major whitewater runs on the Su. Upper little su (above motherlode) is class 4+, Lower su Motherlode to fishhook bridge is class 4+, and Baby Su (Fishhook bridge to edgerton park bridge) is 3-. Mostly characterized by clear cold water flowing over rounded granite boulders and drops of moderate size. Normally ran at flows of 350-900 cfs on the little su gauge. Below the Carneyville bridge to the inlet is all class 1 floating. Normal summer flows can range from 80-1200 cfs. Floods can bring 4500 cfs of water or more.

== Fishing ==
The Alaska Department of Fish and Game operates a weir to count King, Red, Coho, and Chum salmon in the river. The Little Susitna River weir is located a short distance upstream from the Public Use Area off Burma Road. Salmon fishing is closed upstream of the George Parks Highway. The Little Susitna River provides a multitude of sport angling opportunities. King, silver, chum, red, and pink salmon are available, as well as some Dolly Varden and rainbow trout. Several other less targeted species such as Arctic grayling, burbot, round whitefish and northern pike also call the Little Susitna River home.

== See also ==
- List of rivers of Alaska
- Nancy Lake State Recreation Area, which the Little Sustina flows through
