= Independence Mines, Alaska =

- Independence Mines
- U.S. National Register of Historic Places
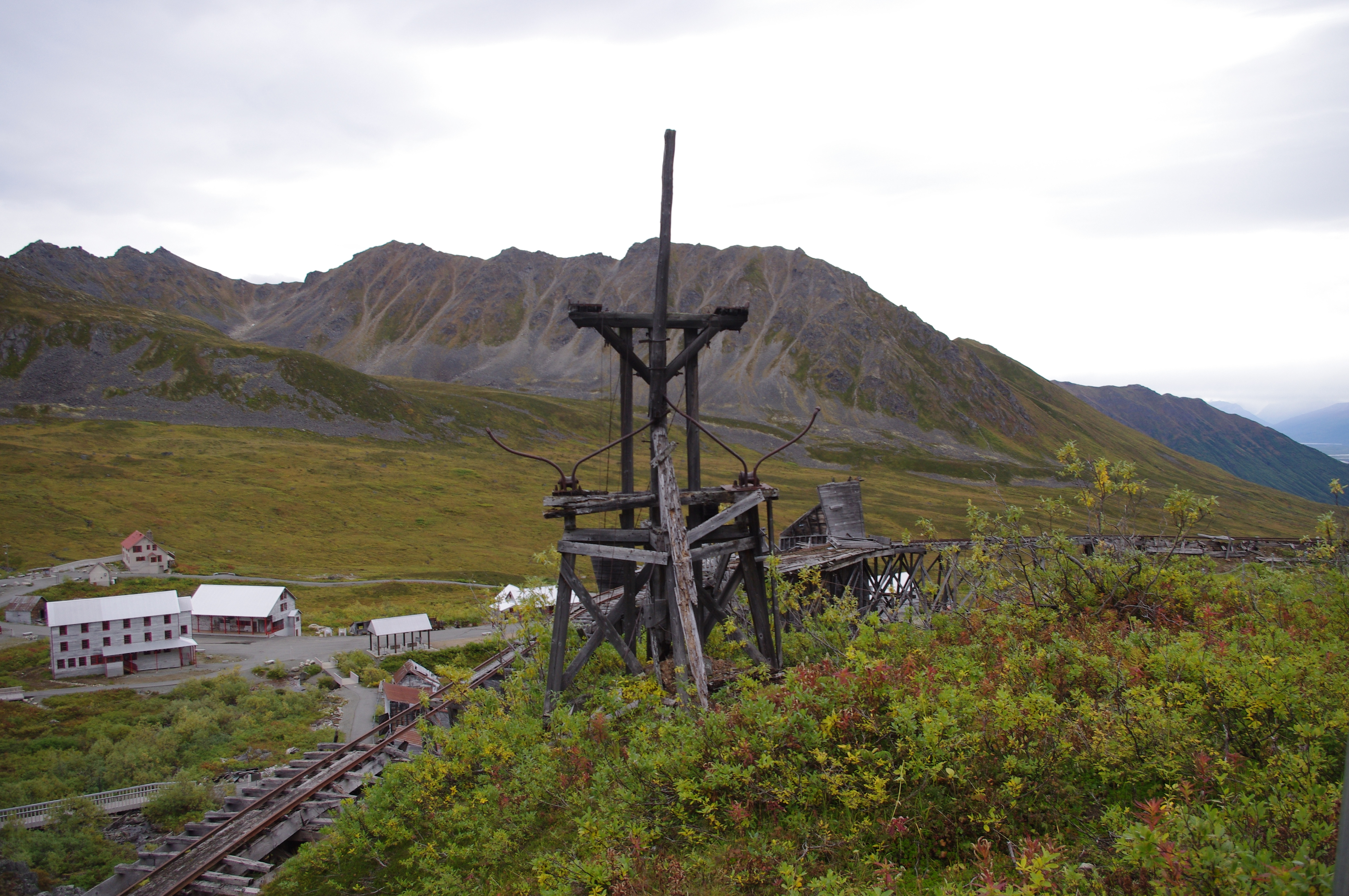
- Remains of the tram and work camp

- Location within Alaska
- Location: About 14.2 miles (22.9 km) northwest of Palmer, Alaska
- Coordinates: 61°47′25″N 149°17′05″W
- Area: 75 acres (30 ha)
- Built: 1934
- Built by: Wasilla Mining Company
- Architect: N. Lester Troast & Associates et al.
- NRHP reference No.: 74000440
- Added to NRHP: October 9, 1974

The Independence Mines, now Independence Mine State Historical Park, is the site of a former gold mining operation in the Talkeetna Mountains, across Hatcher Pass from Palmer, Alaska. The area's mining history dates to at least 1897, when active claims were reported in the vicinity of Fishook Creek. These early mining efforts were eventually joined to form the Wasilla Mining Company, which worked the mines from 1934 to 1943, and again from 1948 to 1950. The mining operation at Independence was the second-largest hard-rock gold mining operation in the state, after a larger site near Juneau. The company and the miners that preceded it built a substantial mining camp, with as many as sixteen wood-frame buildings, which were originally connected to each other by sheltered wooden "tunnels". When the company ended operations in 1950 it had expected to eventually resume them, but never did. This resulted in a particularly well-preserved collection of mining equipment and buildings, although the weather has since taken a significant toll on the latter.

The mining camp was listed on the National Register of Historic Places in 1974. The land was donated to the state in 1980, which established a state historic park on the site.

The mine resumed underground operations in 1979 via Starkey Wilson and Chuck Hawley's Coronado Mining Inc, with the intent to base milling and mine operations on the Willow side (opposite the side of the State Park).

The Independence Gold Mine, located approximately 70 mi (112.7 km) north of Anchorage, has produced in excess of 165,500 oz (4,691.9 kg) of gold. In 1979, Starkey Wilson obtained an option on the property and, in 1981, Enserch Corporation (Dallas, Texas) became a 50-percent partner. Coronado Mining became the mill operator for the partners.

During 1981, extensive underground exploration and development were conducted, and 3,000 tons of ore grading 0.5 oz/ton was stockpiled. The ore occurs in quartz veins that occupy north-northwest-trending shear zones along the southern border of the Talkeetna Batholith. The veins contain pyrite, arsenopyrite, molybdenite, galena, tetrahedrite and free gold. Stockpiled ore has been treated in a 150-TPD mill near the mine site.

The mill contains jig and flotation units, a batch-cyanide system and a Merrill-Crowe precipitation circuit. The mine and mill facility were dedicated in August 1982. In November 1982, Coronado suspended operations for an undisclosed period, citing problems with recovery in the mill as the reason for closure. Company officials have not released total expenditures for the project, but sources estimate development costs through 1983 at $6 million (~$15.8 million in 2024). This figure includes construction of the new mill, living quarters for 30 workers, and several thousand feet of development drifting (including a 3,150-ft (960.1 m) access tunnel). In 1983, the tailings pond was sealed with a bentonite or (TM) extract. Test runs of mill ore produced satisfactory results, but production of gold from mill runs is unknown. An undisclosed amount of subsurface work was also conducted on the property.

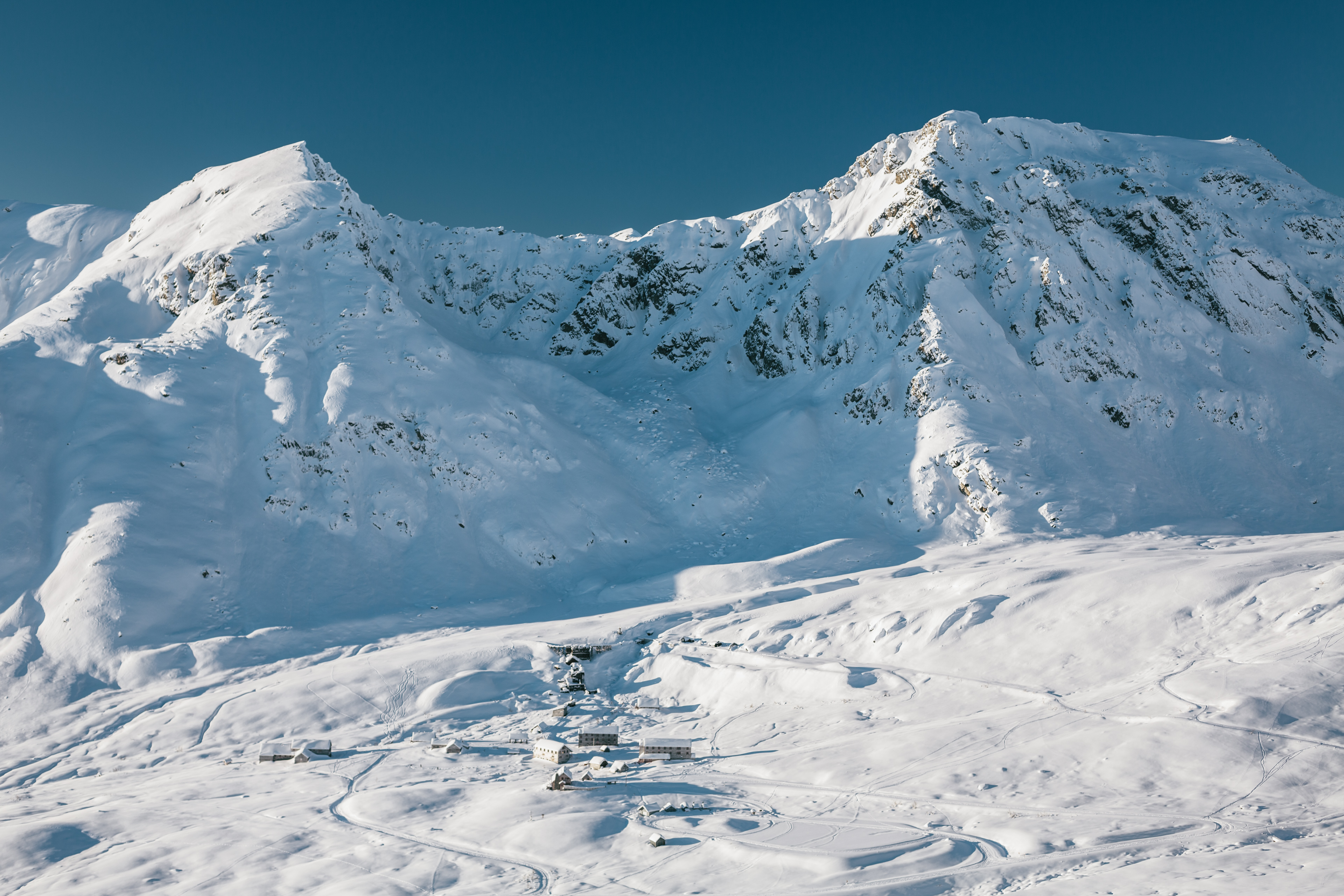
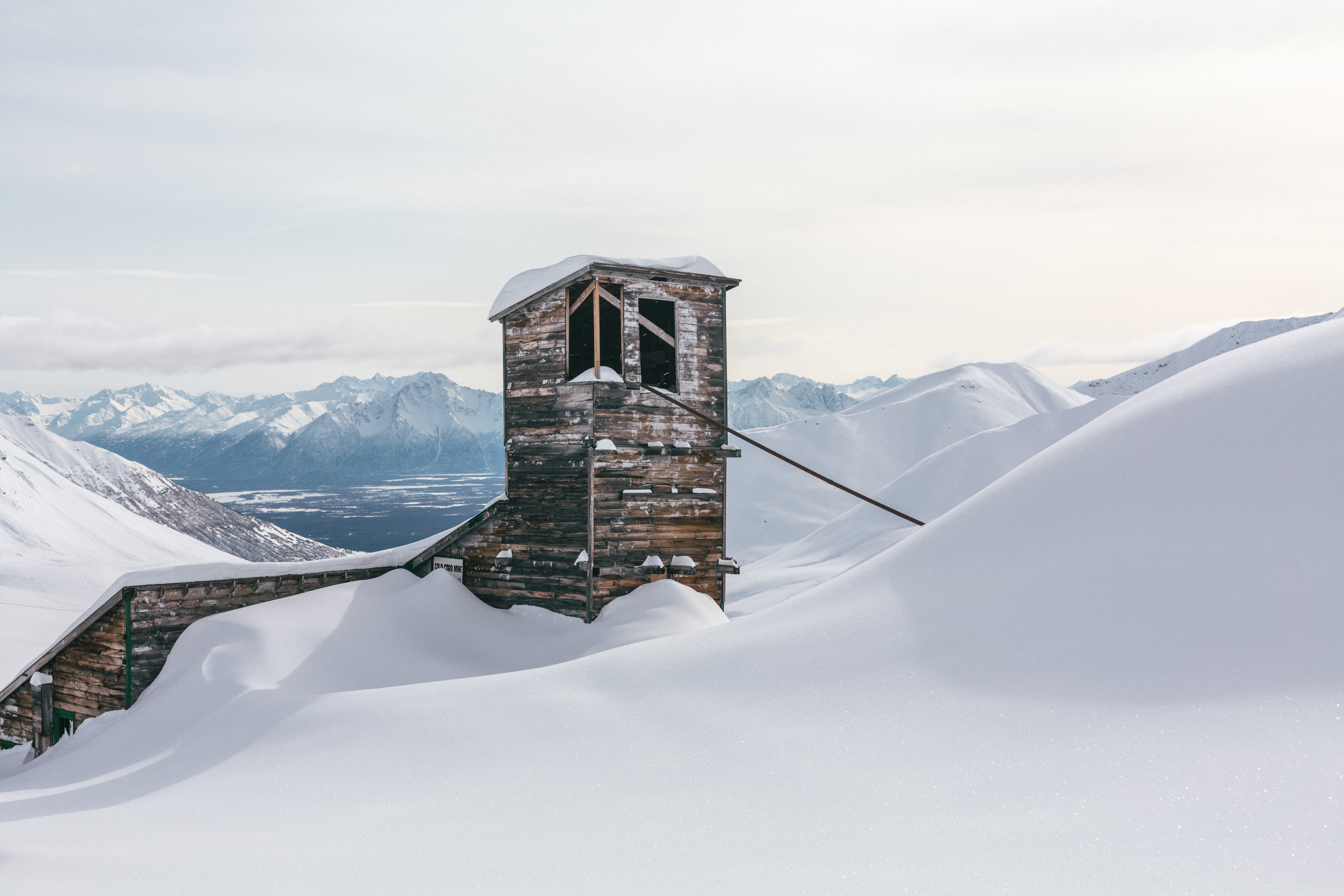
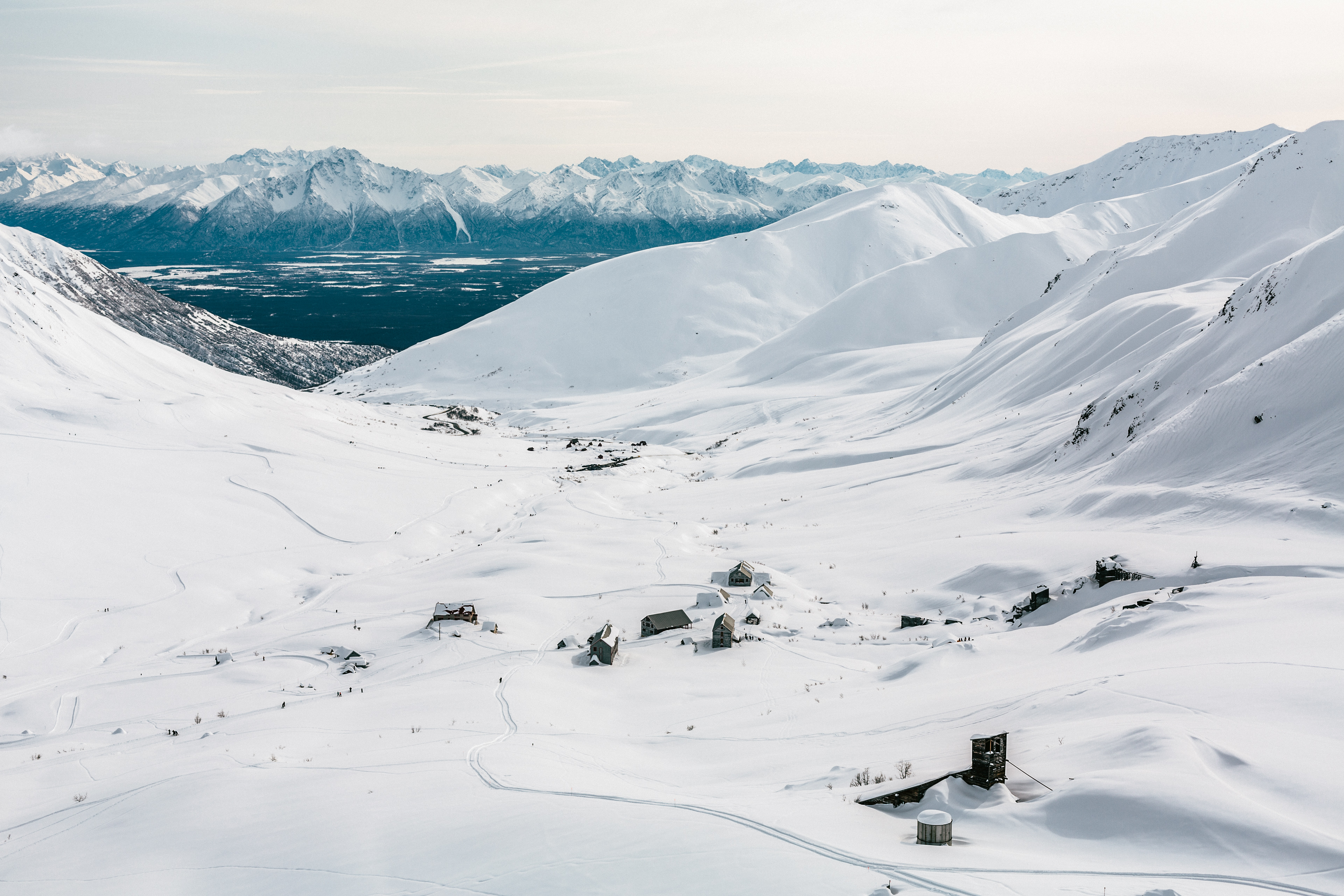
Views of Independence Mine in Hatcher Pass

== Climate ==
Independence Mine State Historic Park has a tundra climate (Köppen ET).

Climate data for Independence Mine, Alaska, 2006–2020 normals, 1998-2020 extremes: 3550ft (1082m)
Month	Jan	Feb	Mar	Apr	May	Jun	Jul	Aug	Sep	Oct	Nov	Dec	Year
Record high °F (°C)	49 (9)	46 (8)	52 (11)	63 (17)	64 (18)	73 (23)	77 (25)	68 (20)	63 (17)	53 (12)	48 (9)	44 (7)	77 (25)
Mean maximum °F (°C)	37 (3)	38 (3)	41 (5)	48 (9)	56 (13)	62 (17)	65 (18)	62 (17)	55 (13)	46 (8)	39 (4)	37 (3)	65 (18)
Mean daily maximum °F (°C)	22.7 (−5.2)	24.5 (−4.2)	27.3 (−2.6)	37.1 (2.8)	44.9 (7.2)	49.8 (9.9)	53.9 (12.2)	51.6 (10.9)	44.9 (7.2)	35.4 (1.9)	25.7 (−3.5)	24.7 (−4.1)	36.9 (2.7)
Daily mean °F (°C)	18.1 (−7.7)	19.5 (−6.9)	20.8 (−6.2)	29.8 (−1.2)	39.0 (3.9)	44.4 (6.9)	49.4 (9.7)	47.2 (8.4)	40.6 (4.8)	31.0 (−0.6)	21.1 (−6.1)	20.1 (−6.6)	31.8 (−0.1)
Mean daily minimum °F (°C)	13.1 (−10.5)	14.5 (−9.7)	14.0 (−10.0)	22.6 (−5.2)	33.0 (0.6)	39.1 (3.9)	44.8 (7.1)	42.9 (6.1)	36.2 (2.3)	26.7 (−2.9)	16.9 (−8.4)	15.5 (−9.2)	26.6 (−3.0)
Mean minimum °F (°C)	−6 (−21)	−2 (−19)	−1 (−18)	10 (−12)	24 (−4)	32 (0)	38 (3)	36 (2)	27 (−3)	13 (−11)	1 (−17)	−1 (−18)	−10 (−23)
Record low °F (°C)	−20 (−29)	−20 (−29)	−13 (−25)	−6 (−21)	15 (−9)	28 (−2)	33 (1)	30 (−1)	21 (−6)	0 (−18)	−9 (−23)	−14 (−26)	−20 (−29)
Average precipitation inches (mm)	2.69 (68)	2.62 (67)	2.33 (59)	2.09 (53)	2.24 (57)	3.12 (79)	4.79 (122)	6.48 (165)	6.49 (165)	3.98 (101)	2.73 (69)	2.85 (72)	42.41 (1,077)
Source 1: XMACIS2
Source 2: NOAA (Precipitation)

== See also ==
- National Register of Historic Places listings in Matanuska-Susitna Borough, Alaska
- List of Alaska state parks
