= Doublemint Peak =

Mountain in Alaska, United States

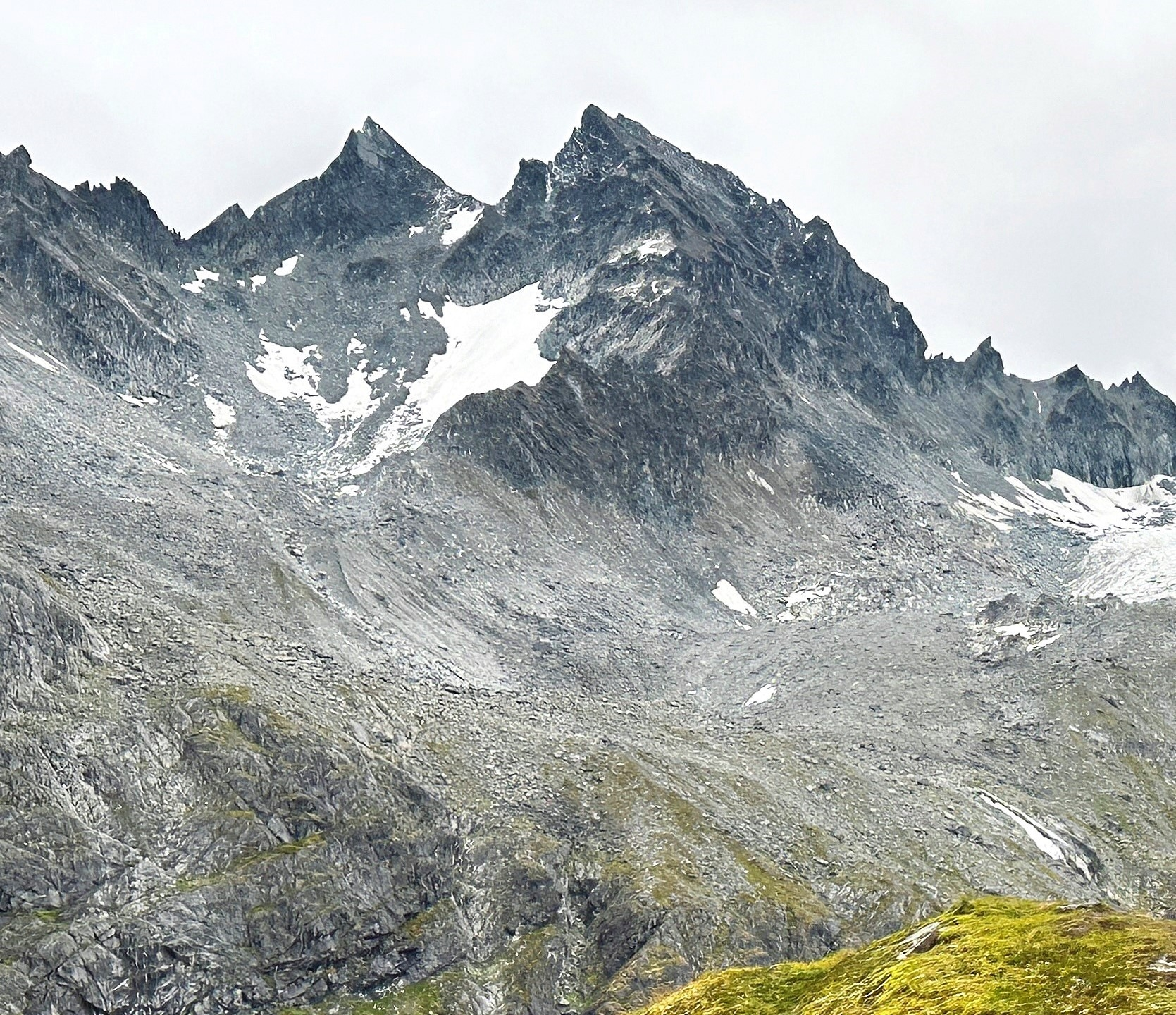
- Northwest aspect

Highest point
- Elevation: 6,372 ft (1,942 m)
- Prominence: 479 ft (146 m)
- Parent peak: Troublemint Peak
- Isolation: 0.6 mi (0.97 km)
- Coordinates: 61°51′01″N 149°02′13″W

Geography
- Location within Alaska
- Country: United States
- State: Alaska
- Borough: Matanuska-Susitna
- Protected area: Hatcher Pass Management Area
- Parent range: Talkeetna Mountains
- Topo map: USGS Anchorage D-6

Doublemint Peak is a 6,372-foot-elevation (1,942-meter) summit in Alaska, United States.

== Description ==
Doublemint Peak, also known as Doublemint Spires or simply Doublemint, is located 19 miles (31 km) north of Palmer, Alaska, in the Talkeetna Mountains and in the Hatcher Pass Management Area of the state park system. The south spire is 6,372-ft and the lower north spire reaches 6,308-ft elevation. Precipitation runoff from this mountain's west slope drains into headwaters of the Little Susitna River, whereas the east side drains into Moose Creek which is a tributary of the Matanuska River. Topographic relief is significant as the summit rises 3,372 feet (1,028 meters) above Little Susitna River in one mile (1.6 km). The nearest higher neighbor is Troublemint Peak, 0.6 mile (1 km) to the north. The approach to the peak is via the eight-mile Gold Mint Trail which reaches the Mint Glacier Hut. Doublemint was so named in July 1968 by Curt and Gretchen Wagner who compared the granite towers to those in The Bugaboos. Other whimsically named peaks near the Mint Glacier include Spearmint Spire, Triplemint Peak, and Telemint Spire. This mountain's toponym has not been officially adopted by the United States Board on Geographic Names.

== Climate ==
Based on the Köppen climate classification, Doublemint is located in a subarctic climate zone with long, cold, snowy winters, and short cool summers. Winter temperatures can drop below 0 °F with wind chill factors below −10 °F. This climate supports remnants of the Doublemint Glacier on the south slope and the Mint Glacier further northwest. The months of May through June offer the most favorable weather for climbing or viewing.

== See also ==
- Geography of Alaska

== Gallery ==
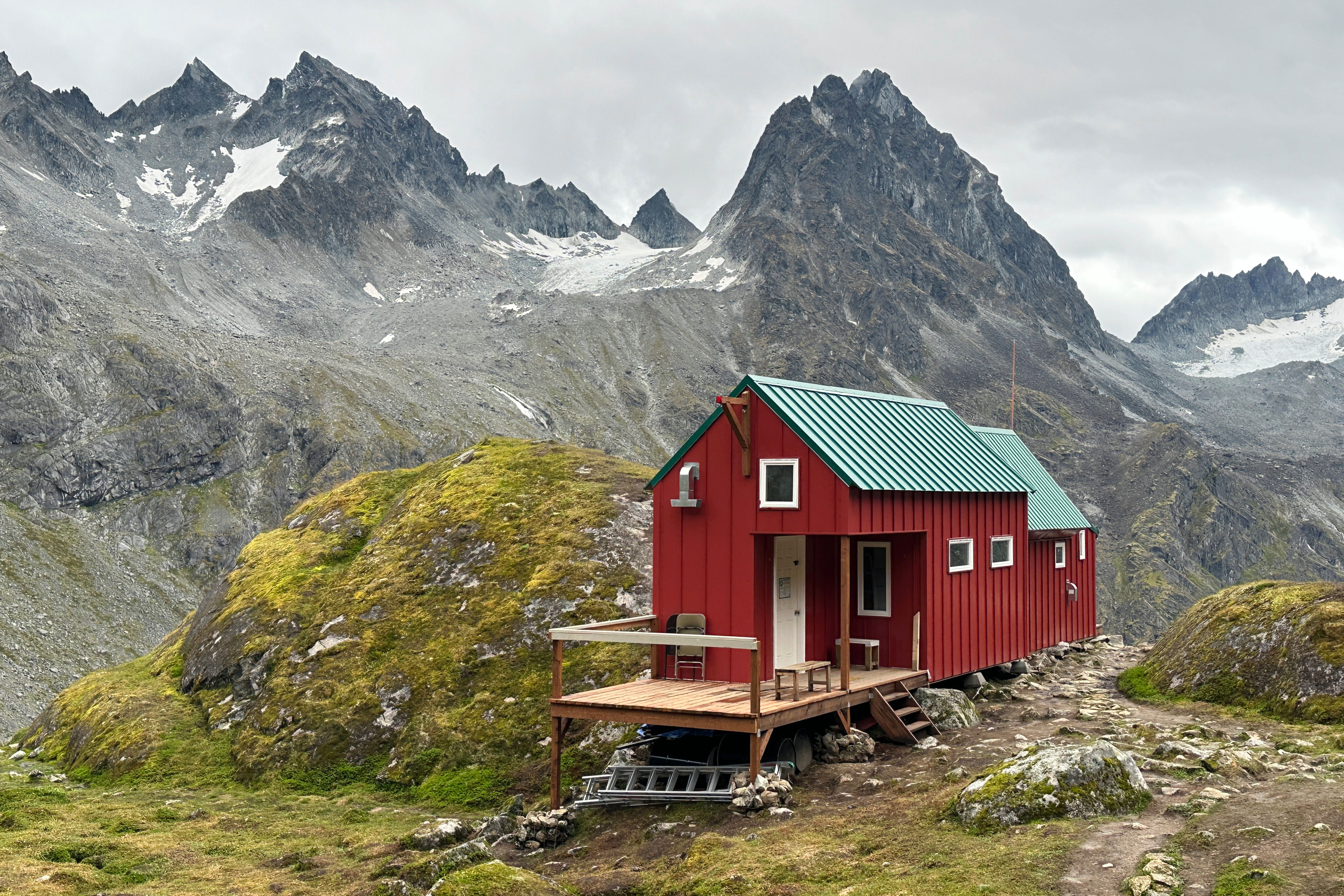
Doublemint to the left, Triplemint to right above the Mint Glacier Hut

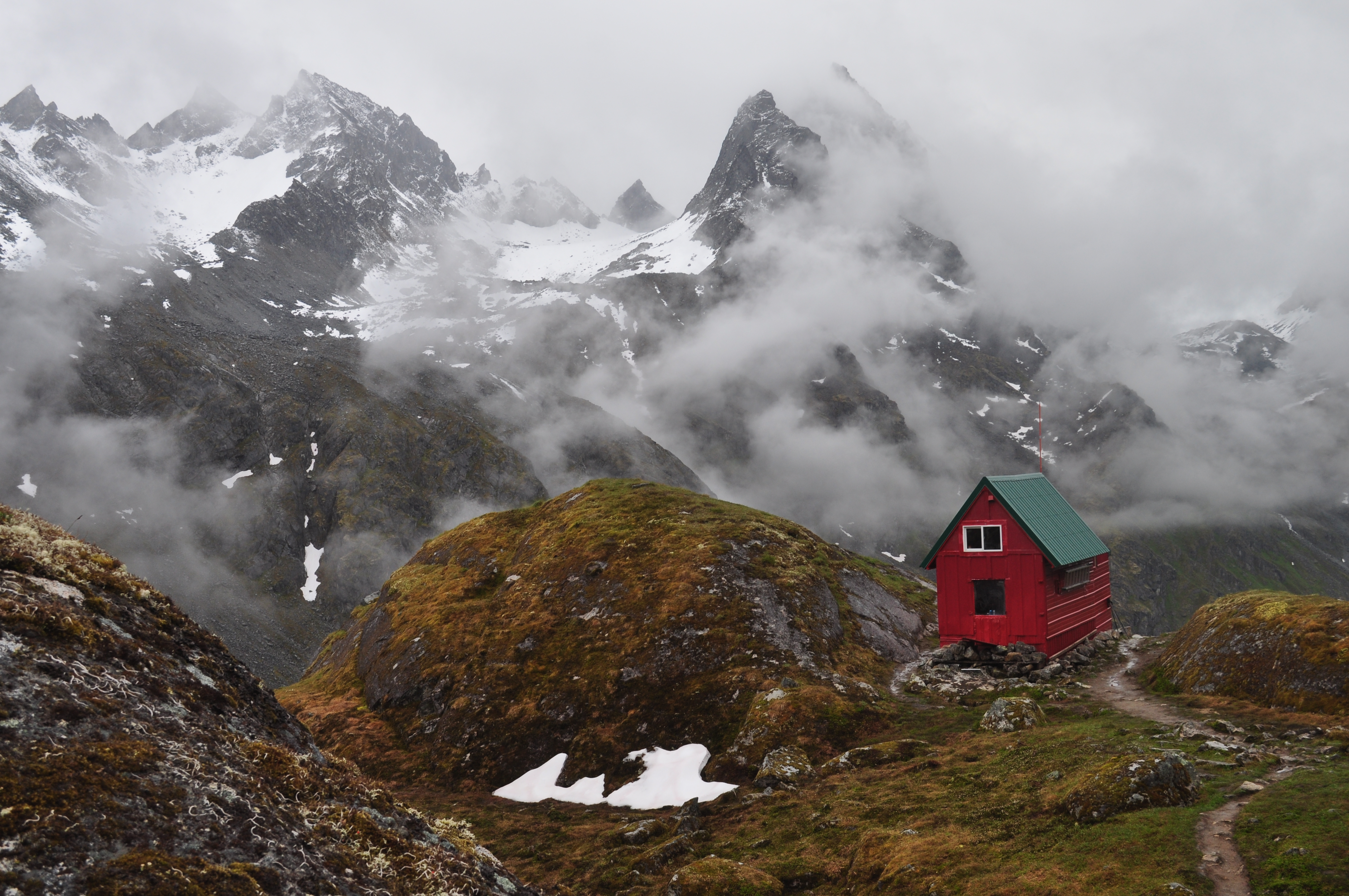
Doublemint to the left

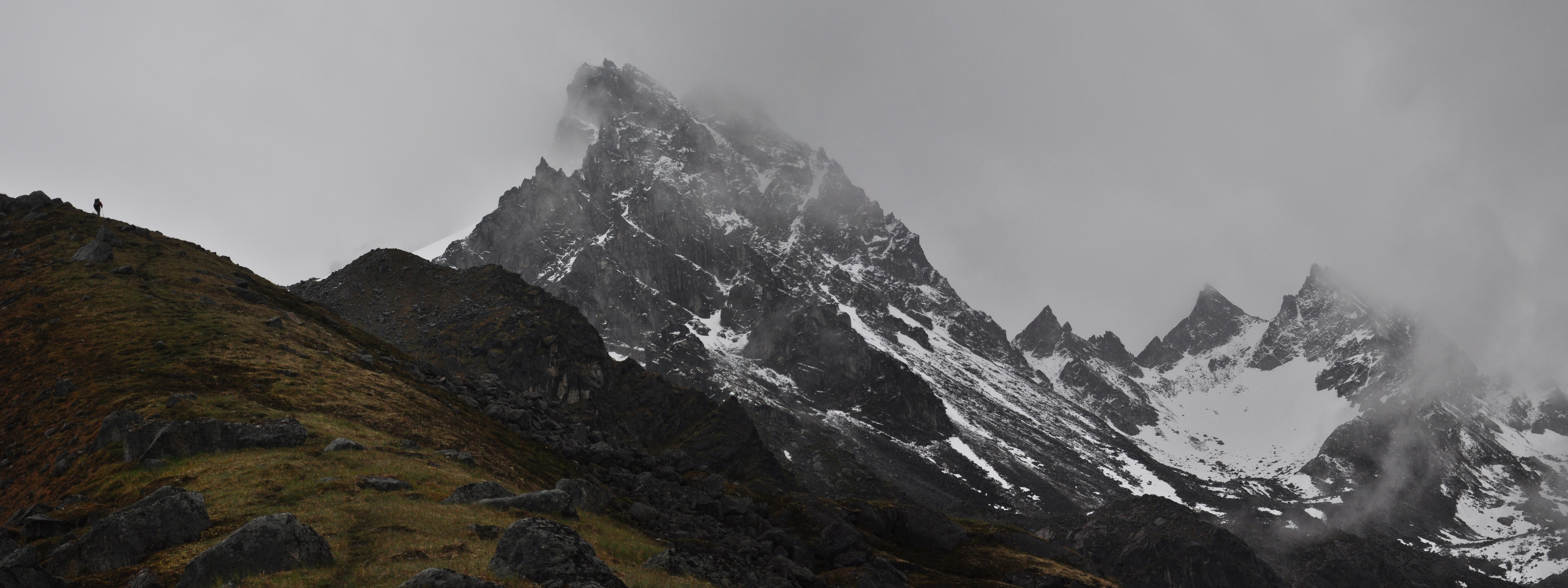
Troublemint (center) and Doublemint (right)
