= Gunsight Mountain =

Mountain in Alaska, United States

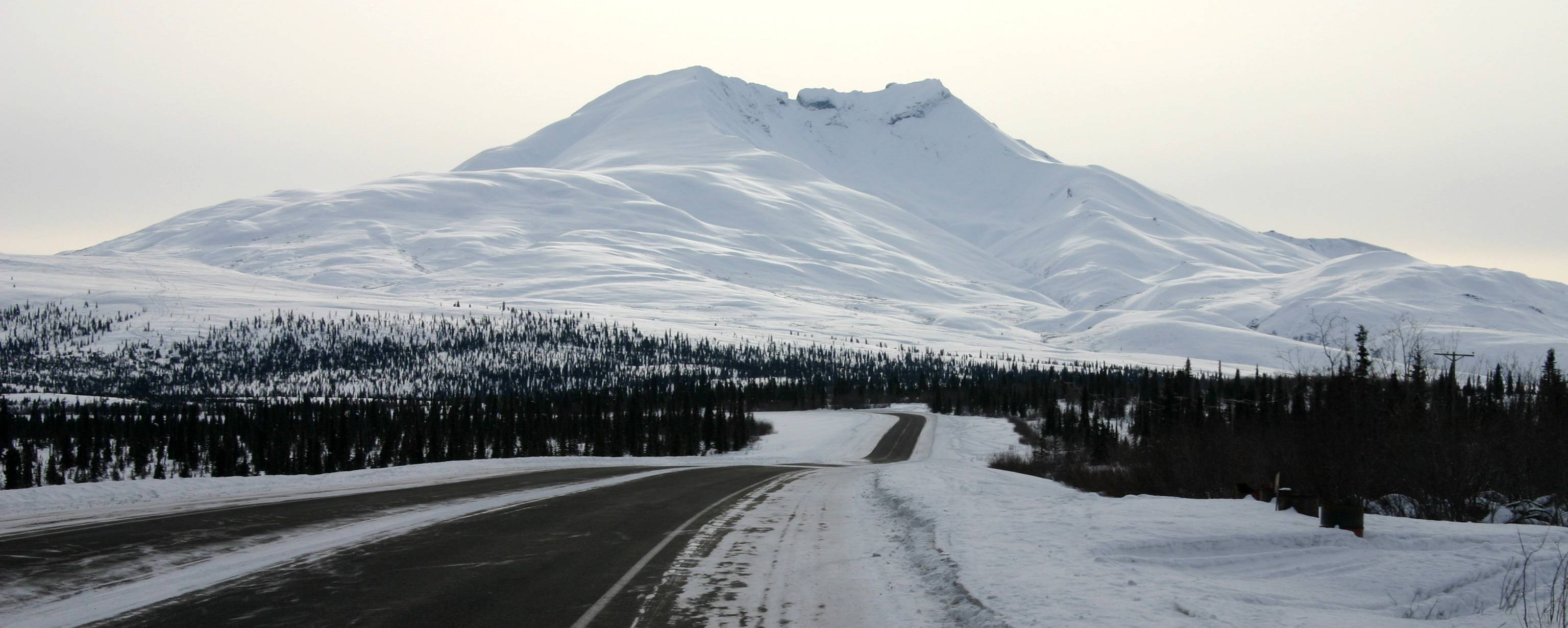
- Northeast aspect from Glenn Highway

Highest point
- Elevation: 6,441 ft (1,963 m)
- Prominence: 3,441 ft (1,049 m)
- Isolation: 7.39 mi (11.89 km)
- Coordinates: 61°50′39″N 147°28′02″W

Geography
- Location within Alaska
- Interactive map of Gunsight Mountain
- Location: Matanuska-Susitna Borough; Alaska, United States
- Parent range: Talkeetna Mountains
- Topo map: USGS Anchorage D-2

Climbing
- Easiest route: unmaintained trail, scramble

Gunsight Mountain is a prominent 6,441-foot (1,963 m) elevation summit located 56 mi (90 km) northeast of Palmer in the Talkeetna Mountains of the U.S. state of Alaska. This landmark is set midway between Palmer and Glennallen, with the Glenn Highway traversing the southern base of this mountain. This remote mountain is situated at the east end of Sheep Mountain, and 12.2 mi (20 km) northeast of Mount Wickersham, its nearest higher peak. The mountain's descriptive local name was reported in 1952 by U.S. Geological Survey, and derives from a conspicuous deep notch in the summit ridge which has the appearance of a gunsight. This mountain is called Siz'aani, meaning "Heart", in the Ahtna language.

== Climate ==
Based on the Köppen climate classification, Gunsight Mountain is located in a subarctic climate zone with long, cold, snowy winters, and mild summers. Winter temperatures can drop below −20 °C with wind chill factors below −30 °C. The months May through June offer the most favorable weather for climbing or viewing. Precipitation runoff from the mountain drains into tributaries of the Matanuska River.

== See also ==
- Matanuska Formation
- Geography of Alaska
