= Spearmint Spire =

Mountain in Alaska, United States

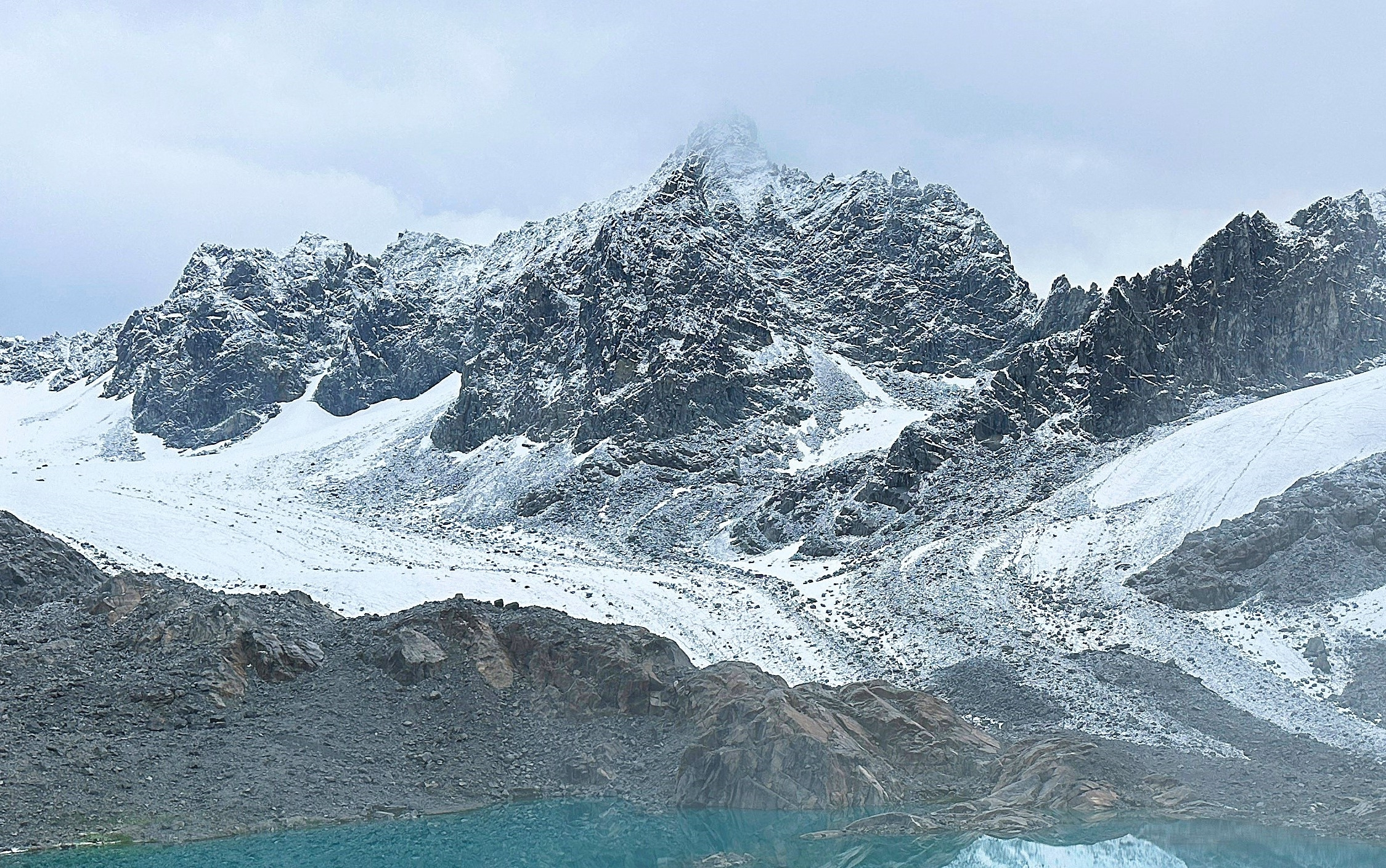
- South-southwest aspect

Highest point
- Elevation: 6,750 ft (2,057 m)
- Prominence: 400 ft (122 m)
- Parent peak: Montana Peak (6,949 ft)
- Isolation: 0.73 mi (1.17 km)
- Coordinates: 61°52′24″N 149°02′52″W

Geography
- Location within Alaska
- Country: United States
- State: Alaska
- Borough: Matanuska-Susitna
- Protected area: Hatcher Pass Management Area
- Parent range: Talkeetna Mountains
- Topo map: USGS Anchorage D-6

Spearmint Spire is a 6,750-foot-elevation (2,057-meter) summit in Alaska, United States.

== Description ==
Spearmint Spire, also known simply as Spearmint, is located 21 miles (34 km) north of Palmer, Alaska, in the Talkeetna Mountains and in the Hatcher Pass Management Area of the state park system. Precipitation runoff from this mountain's west slope drains into headwaters of the Little Susitna River, whereas the east side drains into headwaters of Moose Creek which is a tributary of the Matanuska River. Topographic relief is significant as the summit rises 3,200 feet (975 meters) above Moose Creek in one mile (1.6 km). The approach to the peak is via the eight-mile Gold Mint Trail which reaches the Mint Glacier Hut. The peak was named Spearmint Spire in 1968 by Curt and Gretchen Wagner who compared the granite tower to those in The Bugaboos. Other whimsically named peaks near the Mint Glacier include Troublemint Peak, Triplemint Peak, Doublemint Peak, and Telemint Spire. This mountain's toponym has not been officially adopted by the United States Board on Geographic Names.

== Climate ==
Based on the Köppen climate classification, Spearmint is located in a subarctic climate zone with long, cold, snowy winters, and short cool summers. Winter temperatures can drop below 0 °F with wind chill factors below −10 °F. This climate supports the Mint Glacier on the west slope as well as a small unnamed glacier on the north slope. The months of May through June offer the most favorable weather for climbing or viewing.

== See also ==
- Geography of Alaska

== Gallery ==
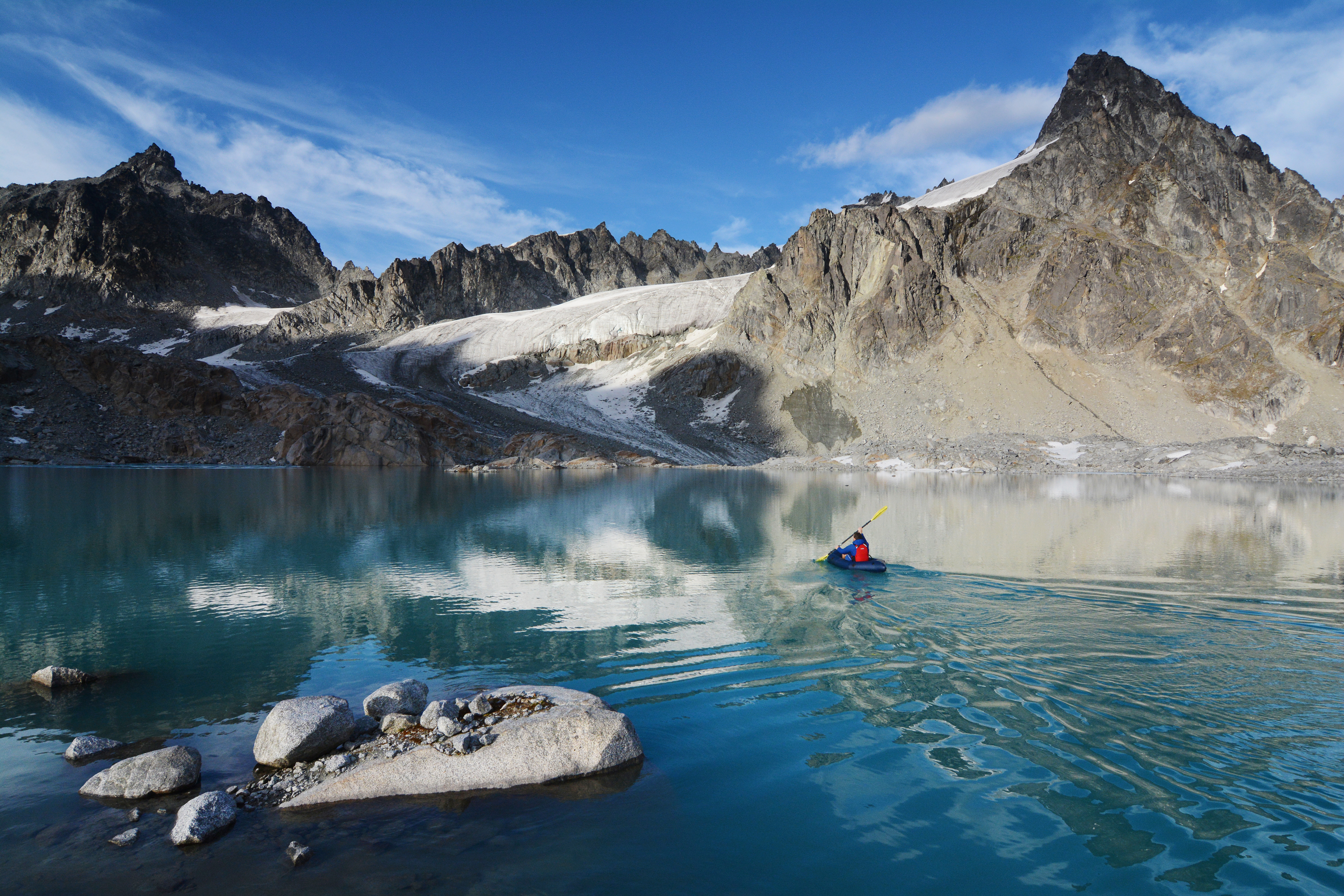
Spearmint (left) and Troublemint (right) from Moonstone Lake

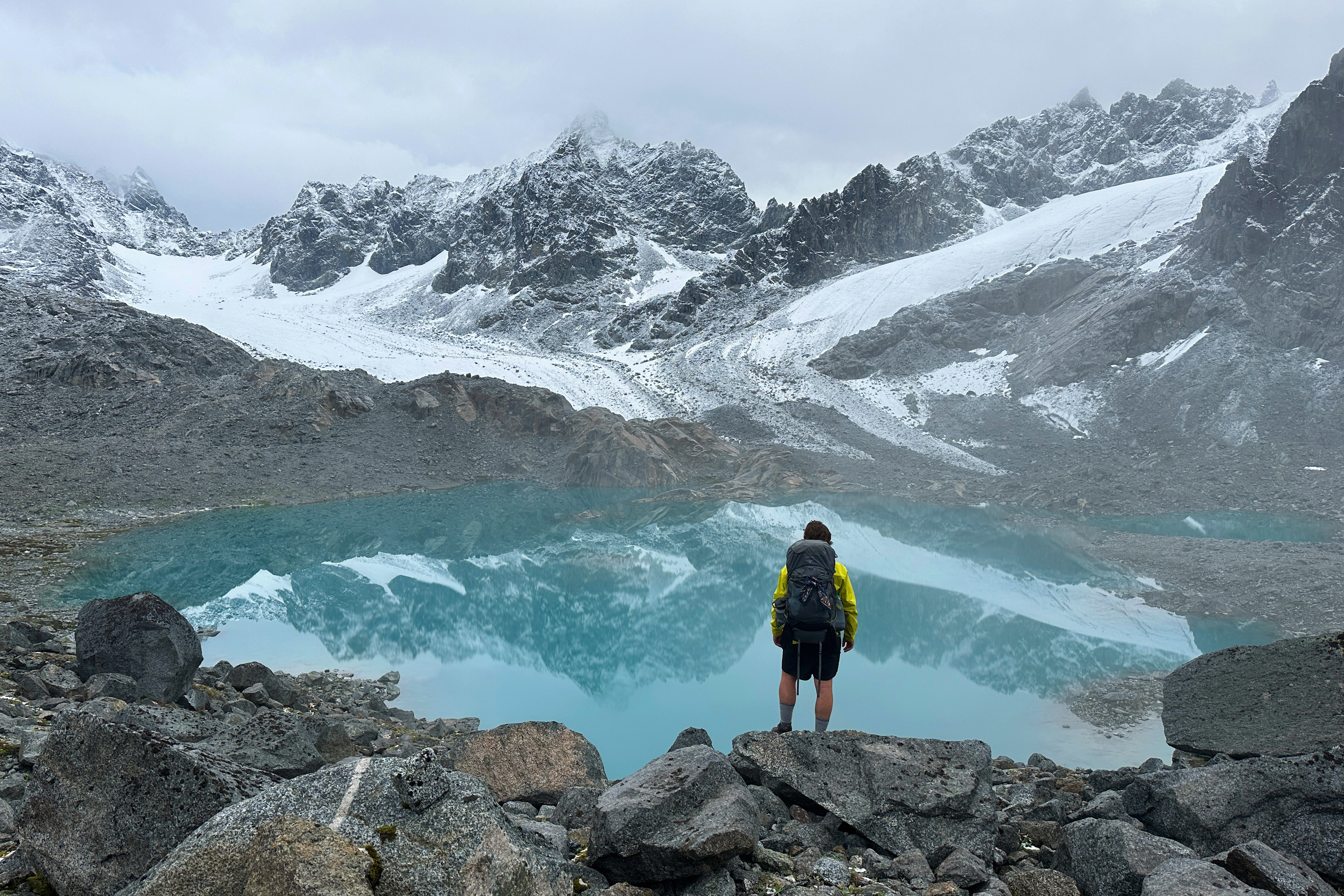
Spearmint reflected in Moonstone Lake
