= Sheep Mountain (Alaska) =

Mountain in Alaska, United States

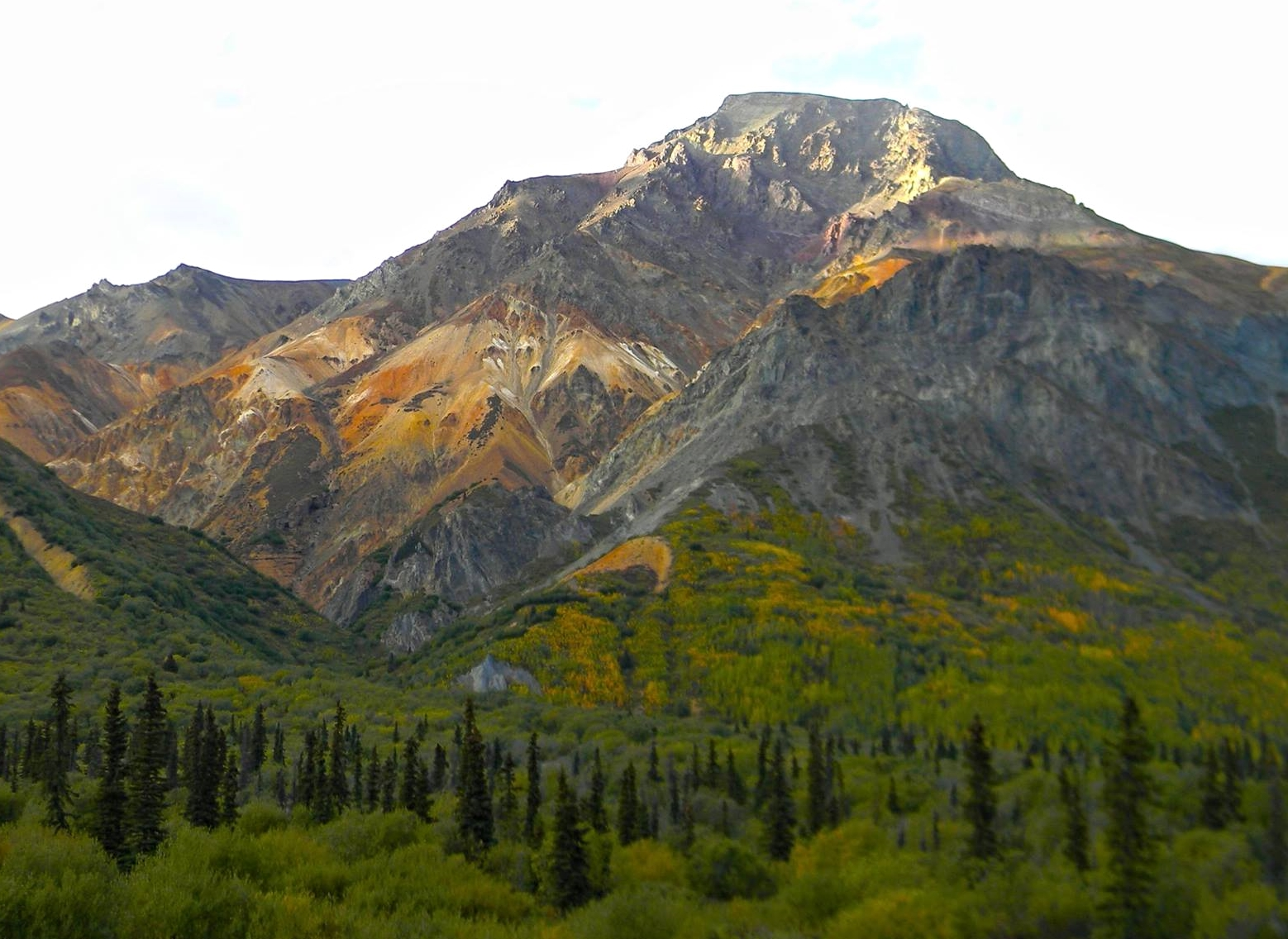
- South aspect from Glenn Highway, early Sept.

Highest point
- Elevation: 6,223 ft (1,897 m)
- Prominence: 323 ft (98 m)
- Parent peak: Gunsight Mountain
- Isolation: 1.6 mi (2.6 km)
- Coordinates: 61°50′04″N 147°30′45″W

Geography
- Location within Alaska
- Interactive map of Sheep Mountain
- Location: Matanuska-Susitna Borough; Alaska, United States
- Parent range: Talkeetna Mountains
- Topo map: USGS Anchorage D-2

Sheep Mountain is a 6,223-foot (1,897 m) elevation summit located 50 mi (80 km) northeast of Palmer in the southern Talkeetna Mountains of the U.S. state of Alaska. This landmark is set midway between Palmer and Glennallen, with the Glenn Highway traversing the southern base of this mountain at mile 113. The mountain is situated 1.6 mi (3 km) west-southwest of Gunsight Mountain, and 10.75 mi (17 km) northeast of Mount Wickersham. The mountain's local name was reported in 1906 by U.S. Geological Survey. It is called Beznae, meaning "(a type of) Stone", in the Ahtna language.

== Climate ==
Based on the Köppen climate classification, Sheep Mountain is located in a subarctic climate zone with long, cold, snowy winters, and mild summers. Temperatures can drop below −20 °C with wind chill factors below −30 °C. The months May through June offer the most favorable weather for climbing or viewing. Precipitation runoff from the mountain drains into tributaries of the Matanuska River.

== Gallery ==
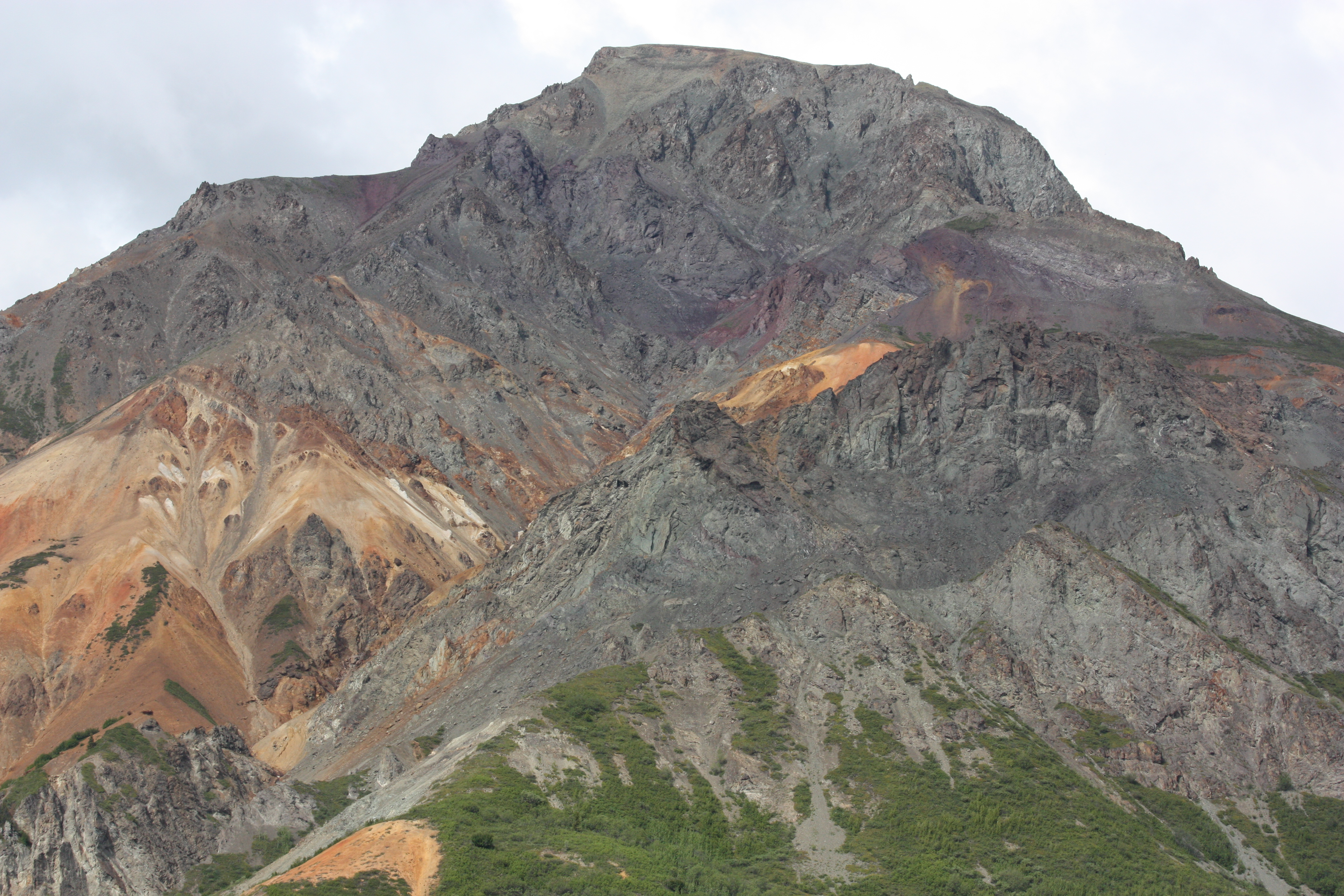

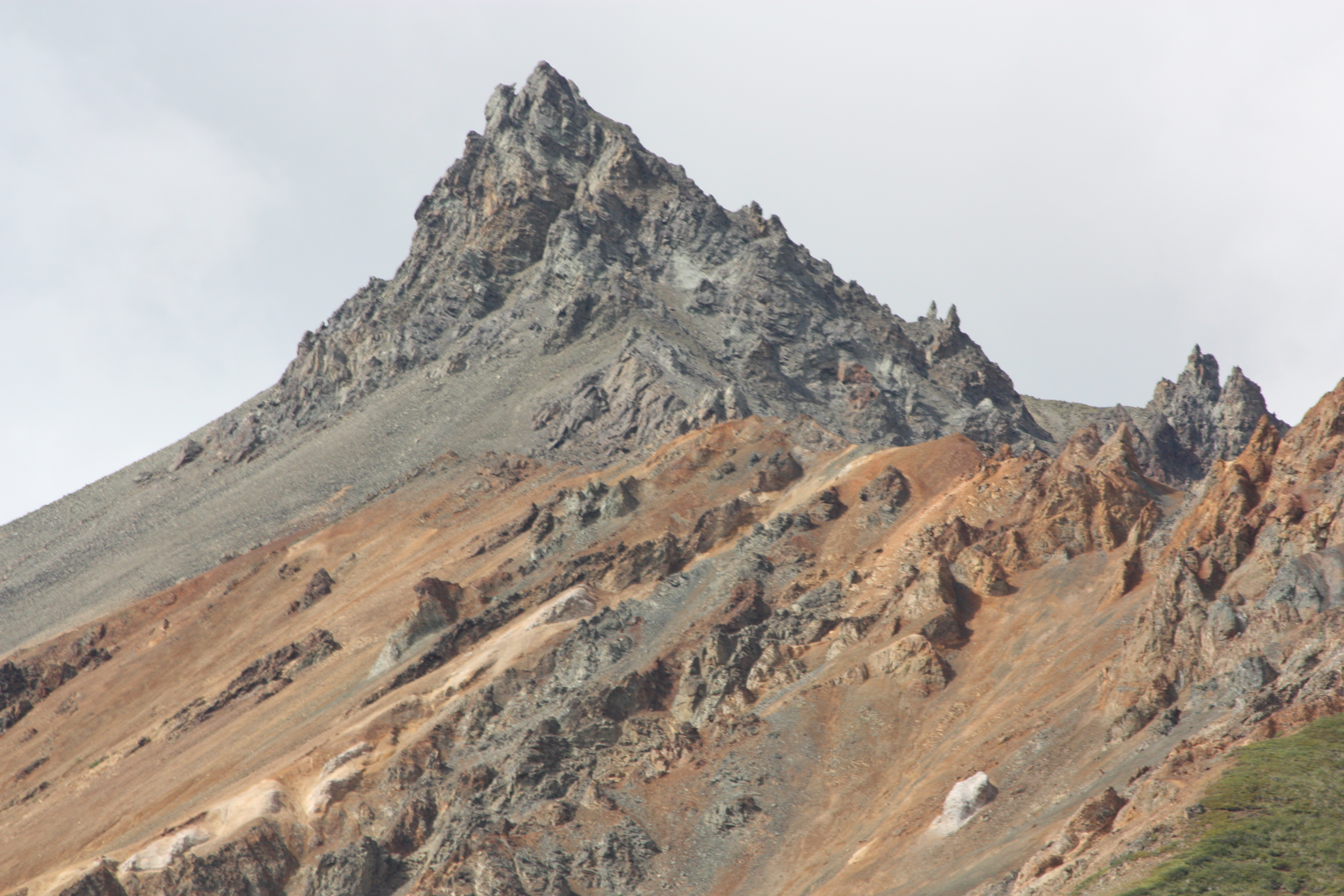

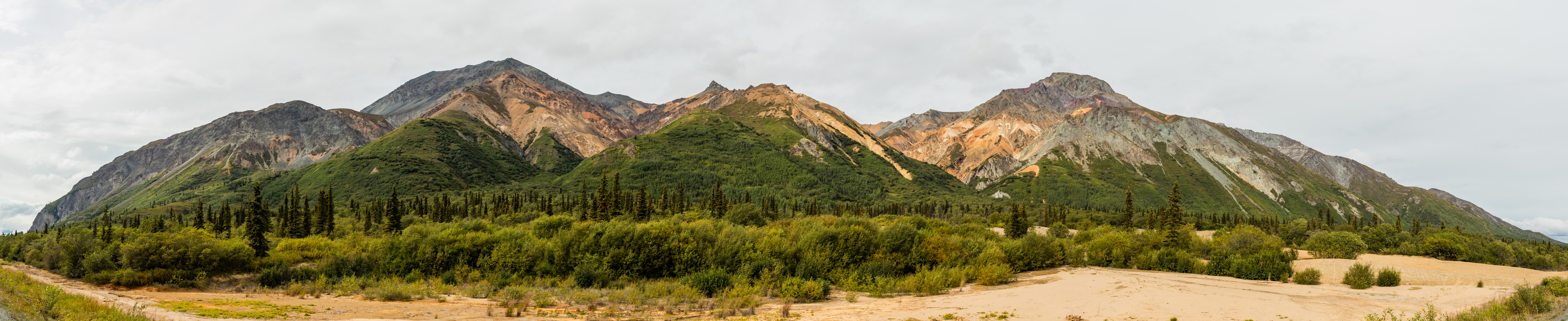

== See also ==
- Matanuska Formation
- Geography of Alaska
