= Granite Peak (Matanuska-Susitna, Alaska) =

Mountain in Alaska, United States

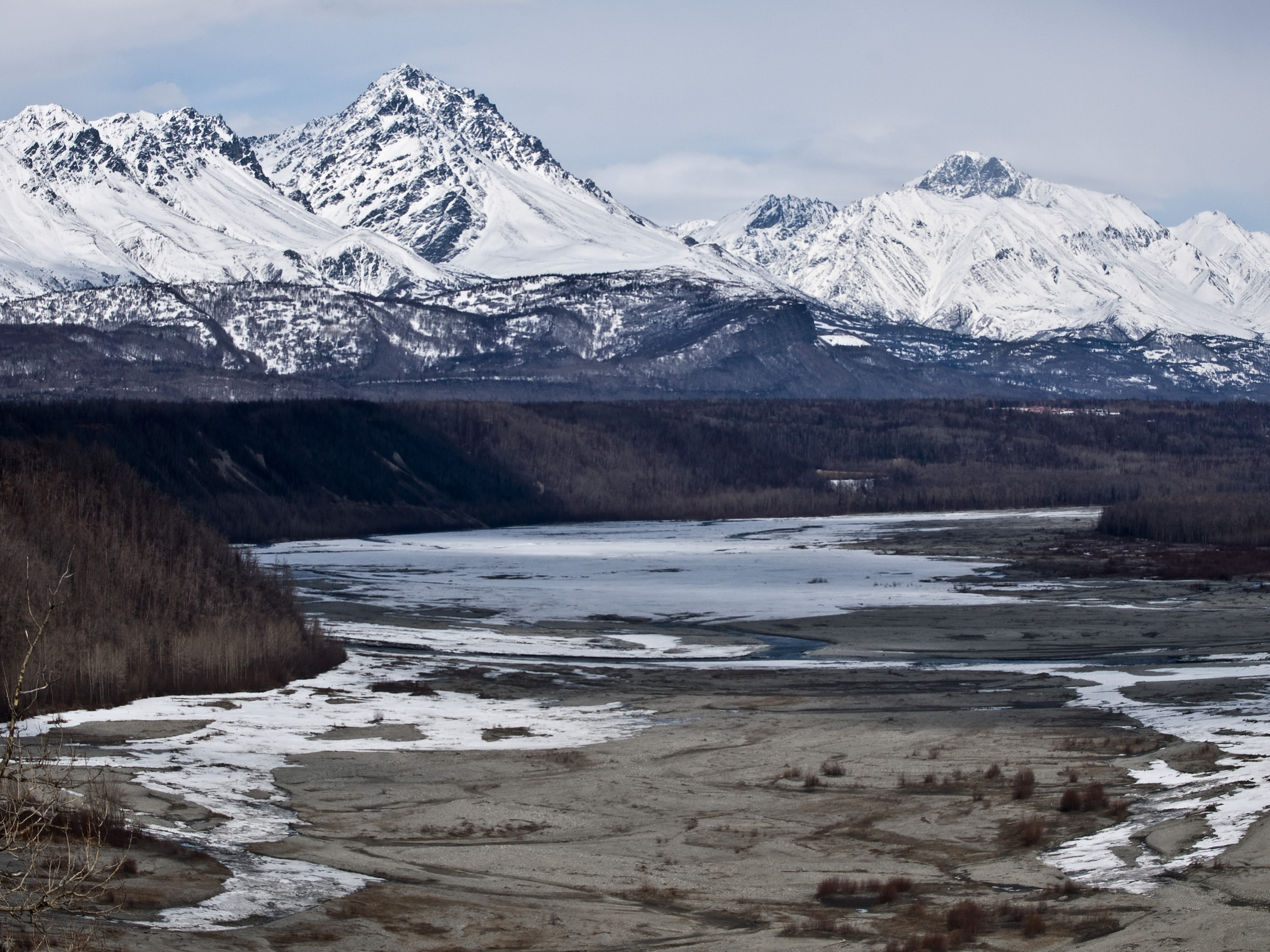
- Southwest aspect, from Palmer area (Lava Mountain to right)

Highest point
- Elevation: 6,729 ft (2,051 m)
- Prominence: 1,529 ft (466 m)
- Isolation: 5.69 mi (9.16 km)
- Coordinates: 61°47′48″N 148°53′09″W

Geography
- Location within Alaska
- Interactive map of Granite Peak
- Location: Matanuska-Susitna Borough; Alaska, United States
- Parent range: Talkeetna Mountains
- Topo map: USGS Anchorage D-6

Climbing
- Easiest route: Scrambling

Granite Peak is a 6,729-foot (2,051 m) elevation summit located 16 mi (26 km) northeast of Palmer in the southern Talkeetna Mountains of the U.S. state of Alaska. This landmark of the Matanuska Valley is set midway between Palmer and Chickaloon, with the Glenn Highway traversing the southern base of this mountain. This mountain is situated 6 mi (10 km) north of Sutton, and 13 mi (21 km) north of Matanuska Peak. The mountain's descriptive local name was reported in 1946 by U.S. Geological Survey, and officially adopted that same year by the U.S. Board on Geographic Names. This mountain is called Hdighilen Dghilaaye' in the Ahtna language.

== Climate ==
Based on the Köppen climate classification, Granite Peak is located in a subarctic climate zone with long, cold, snowy winters, and mild summers. Temperatures can drop below −20 °C with wind chill factors below −30 °C. The months May through June offer the most favorable weather for climbing or viewing. Precipitation runoff from the mountain drains into Eska and Granite Creeks, both of which are tributaries of the Matanuska River.

== Gallery ==
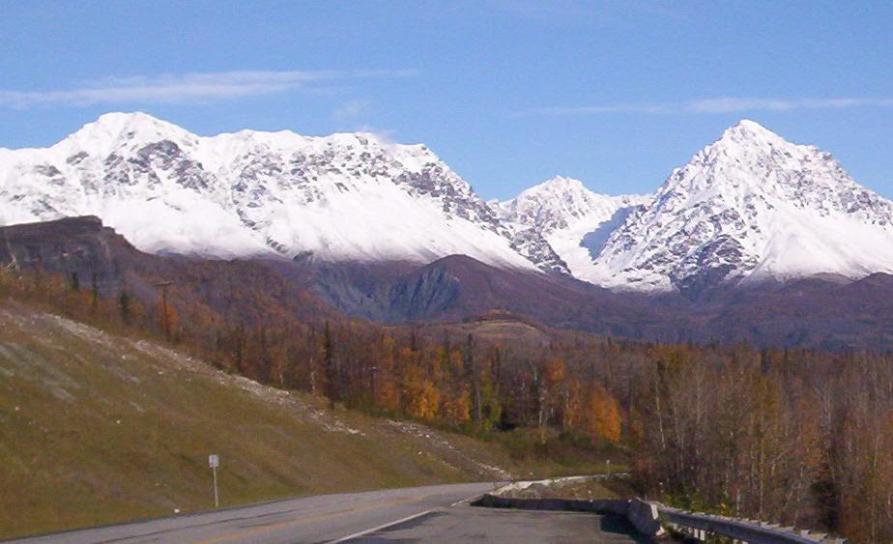
Eska Mountain (left) and Granite Peak (right)

== See also ==
- Matanuska Formation
- Geography of Alaska
