= Reed Lakes =

Lake in the state of Alaska, United States

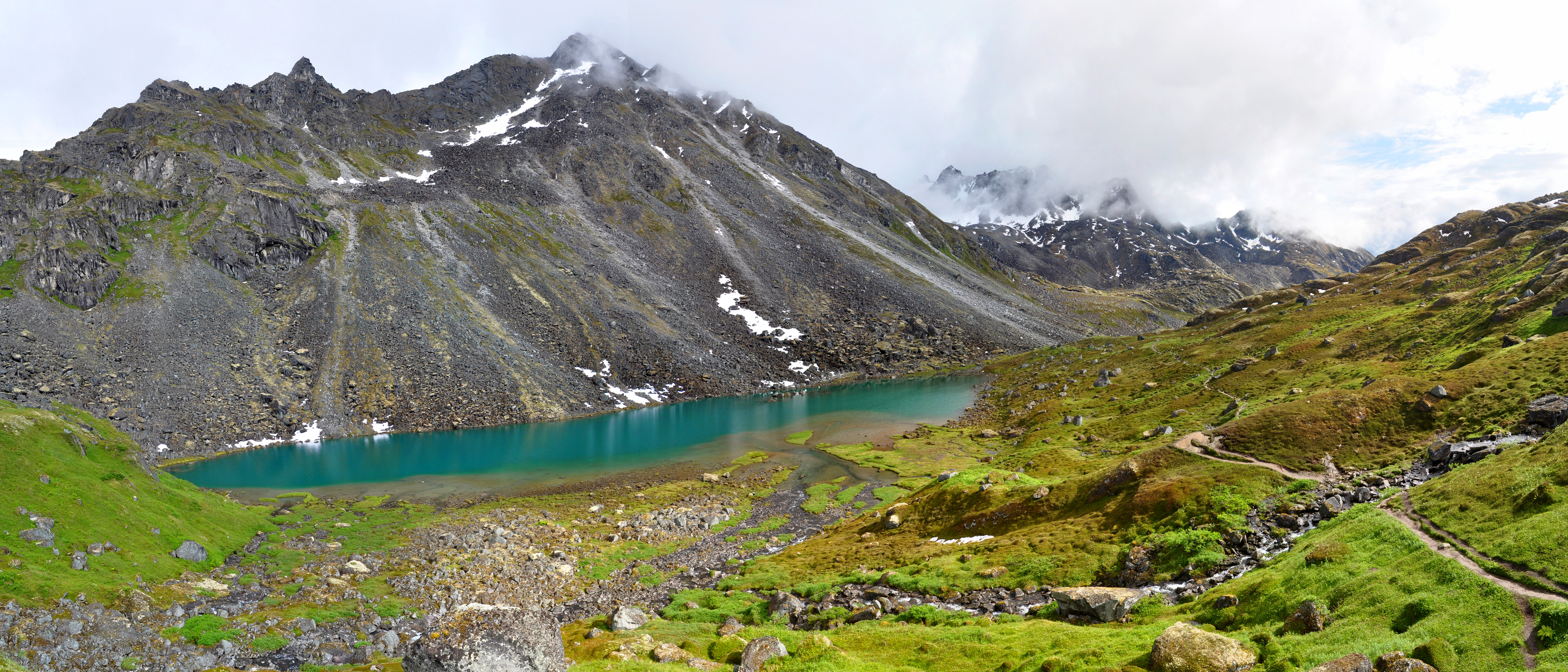
- Interactive map of Reed Lakes
- Location: Talkeetna Mountains, Alaska, United States
- Coordinates: 61°44′13″N 148°44′32″W
- Type: Alpine lakes
- Basin countries: United States
- Surface elevation: 1,289 m (4,229 ft)

The Reed Lakes are a set of two alpine lakes in the Talkeetna Mountains of Alaska. The upper lake is at 1,289 metres (4,229 ft). They are the namesakes of the popular Reed Lakes hiking trail, and are notable for their turquoise color and location in a dramatic glaciated wilderness landscape.

== Recreation and Access ==
A time lapse video of Upper Reed Lake, taken from Bomber Pass

Due to their year-round cold temperatures and the lack of road access, recreation on the lakes themselves is virtually nonexistent. However, the lakes are a popular destination for photographers, hikers, and other outdoor enthusiasts.

The Reed lakes can be accessed from the Reed Lakes trailhead on Fern Mine Road. The hike to the lakes is considered moderate, and includes approximately 1900 ft. of elevation gain to Upper Reed Lake and a scramble over a boulder field. The Reed Lakes also lie on the informal wilderness route known as the Bomber Traverse.
