= Katie John =

Advocate for Alaska Native rights

- Born: 1915
- Died: May 31, 2013; Alaska Native Medical Center
- Awards: Alaska Women's Hall of Fame (2014)

Katie John (October 15, 1915 – May 31, 2013) was an Alaska Native advocate and cultural expert. John was a plaintiff in a court case against the United States challenging the denial of Native subsistence fishing rights, known throughout Alaska as "the Katie John case." She was instrumental in developing an alphabet for the Ahtna language and preserving the culture and traditional way of life of the Ahtna Athabaskan people.

== Personal life and cultural knowledge ==
Katie John was born in 1915 to parents Chief Charley Sanford and Sarah Sanford. John spent most of her life in the northern Wrangell Mountains, with her family traveling seasonally between Tanada Lake and the Batzulnetas village.

John grew up hearing multiple Athabascan languages and dialects. John primarily spoke the Upper Ahtna dialect of Batzulnetas and Mentasta, while her father spoke in the Lower Ahtna dialect and her mother spoke in the Upper Tanana dialect. She first learned to speak English at age fourteen when she was employed in a mine in Nabesna, Alaska.

At age sixteen she married Mentasta traditional chief Fred John, Sr., raising fourteen children and six foster children together. In 1932, the family moved from the Tanada Lakes area to raise their large family in Mentasta.

John taught the Ahtna Athabascan language in local school in Mentasta Lake. In the late 1970s, she was a leader in developing the first alphabet for the then unwritten language. Later she would collaborate on the first Ahtna Noun Dictionary and pronunciation guide to help teach and preserve the language.

John died May 31, 2013, at the Alaska Native Medical Center in Anchorage.

== Fishing rights activism - "The Katie John Case" ==
In 1985 John took up a case against the Alaska State Board of Fisheries, as an activist for subsistence for her native peoples. John argued that she and her people had a right to subsistence fishing, just as her ancestors had. In previous years, the Alaska State Board of Fisheries had closed subsistence fishing, and this greatly disadvantaged her people because the use of nets and fish wheels was disallowed. This case was important to Katie because of her values in community, conservation, and sharing, values seemingly gained from her culture.

John played a large role in this fight, as she met with Governor Tony Knowles at her fish camp in Baltzulneta, aiming to persuade the state to favor her cause. She ultimately prevailed in 1994; the ruling opened all federal waters in Alaska to management priority for rural and Alaska Native residents for subsistence use. Despite multiple appeals, the ruling has been upheld.

== Legacy and honors ==
John received an honorary doctorate of laws degree from the University of Alaska Fairbanks in 2011. for her work in the Ahtna Athabascan language and subsistence fishing rights.

The Alaska Federation of Natives renamed their Hunter and Gathers Award to the Katie John Hunter-Fisher Award in 2013; this award recognizes an Alaska Native who exemplifies and preserves subsistence hunting, trapping and sharing, and the Native way of life.

Alaska Senate Bill 78 was signed into law in 2019, establishing May 31 as Katie John Day to commemorate her work in fishing rights for the well-being of Native peoples.

In 2020, USA Today named John one of the ten most influential women in the history of Alaska as part of its "Women of the Century" series.

== See also ==
- Ahtna language
