= Troublemint Peak =

Mountain in Alaska, United States

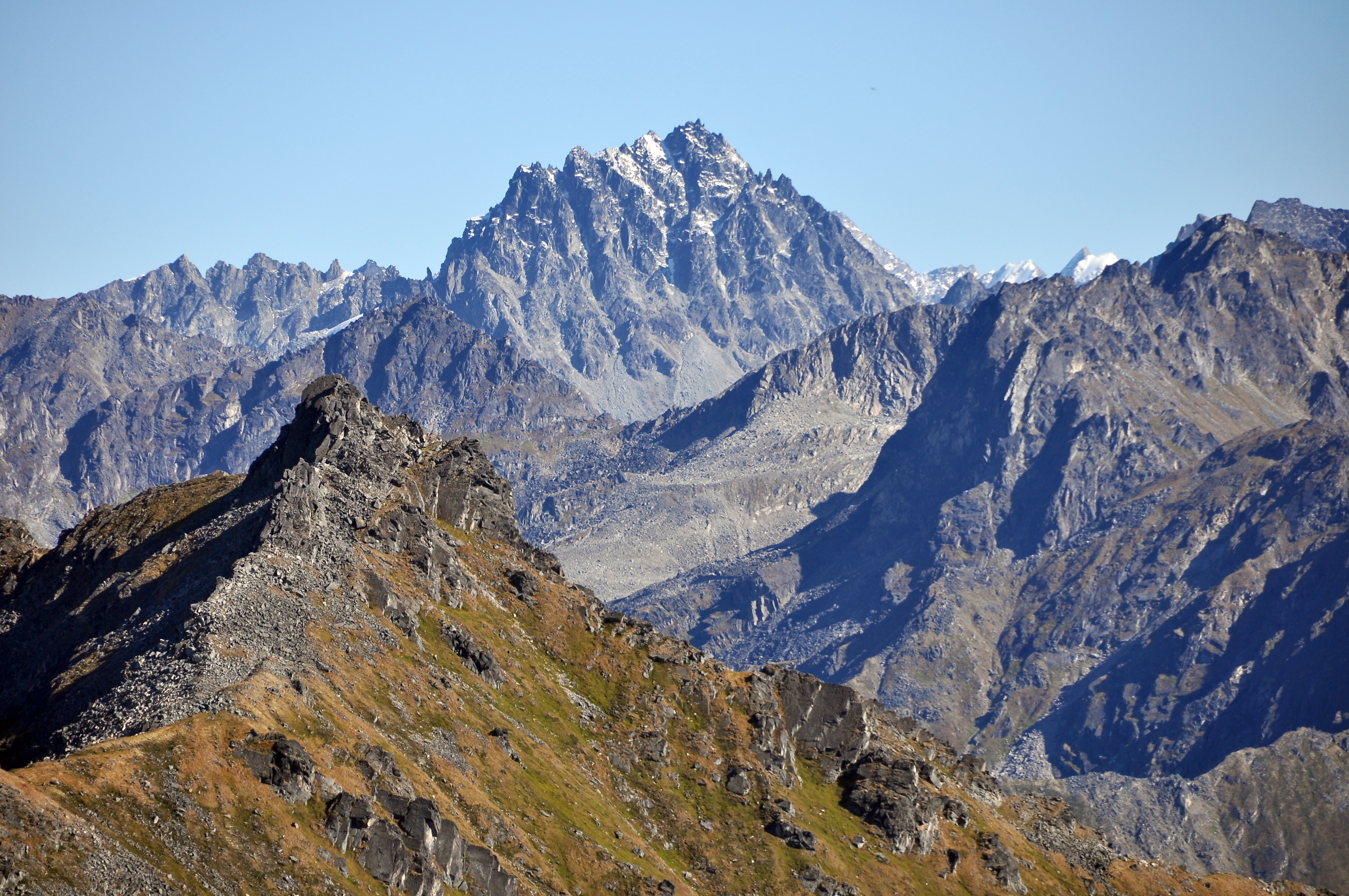
- Southwest aspect (Viewed from Skyscraper Mountain)

Highest point
- Elevation: 6,801 ft (2,073 m)
- Prominence: 1,135 ft (346 m)
- Parent peak: Montana Peak (6,949 ft)
- Isolation: 1.76 mi (2.83 km)
- Coordinates: 61°51′31″N 149°02′34″W

Geography
- Location within Alaska
- Country: United States
- State: Alaska
- Borough: Matanuska-Susitna
- Protected area: Hatcher Pass Management Area
- Parent range: Talkeetna Mountains
- Topo map: USGS Anchorage D-6

Climbing
- First ascent: 1969, Charles McLaughlin
- Easiest route: class 5.6 climbing

Troublemint Peak is a 6,801-foot-elevation (2,073-meter) summit in Alaska, United States.

== Description ==
Troublemint Peak is located 20 miles (32 km) north of Palmer, Alaska, in the Talkeetna Mountains and in the Hatcher Pass Management Area of the state park system. Precipitation runoff from this mountain's west slope drains into headwaters of the Little Susitna River, whereas the east side drains into Moose Creek which is a tributary of the Matanuska River. Topographic relief is significant as the summit rises 3,800 feet (1,158 meters) above Little Susitna River in one mile (1.6 km). The approach to the peak is via the eight-mile Gold Mint Trail which reaches the Mint Glacier Hut. The peak was so named in July 1968 by Curt and Gretchen Wagner who compared the granite tower to those in The Bugaboos. Other whimsically named peaks near the Mint Glacier include Spearmint Spire, Triplemint Peak, Doublemint, and Telemint Spire. The first ascent of the summit was made on August 17, 1969, by Charles A. McLaughlin via the Southeast Ridge. This mountain's toponym has not been officially adopted by the United States Board on Geographic Names.

== Climate ==
Based on the Köppen climate classification, Troublemint is located in a subarctic climate zone with long, cold, snowy winters, and short cool summers. Winter temperatures can drop below 0 °F with wind chill factors below −10 °F. This climate supports the Mint Glacier on the northwest slope. The months of May through June offer the most favorable weather for climbing or viewing.

== Gallery ==
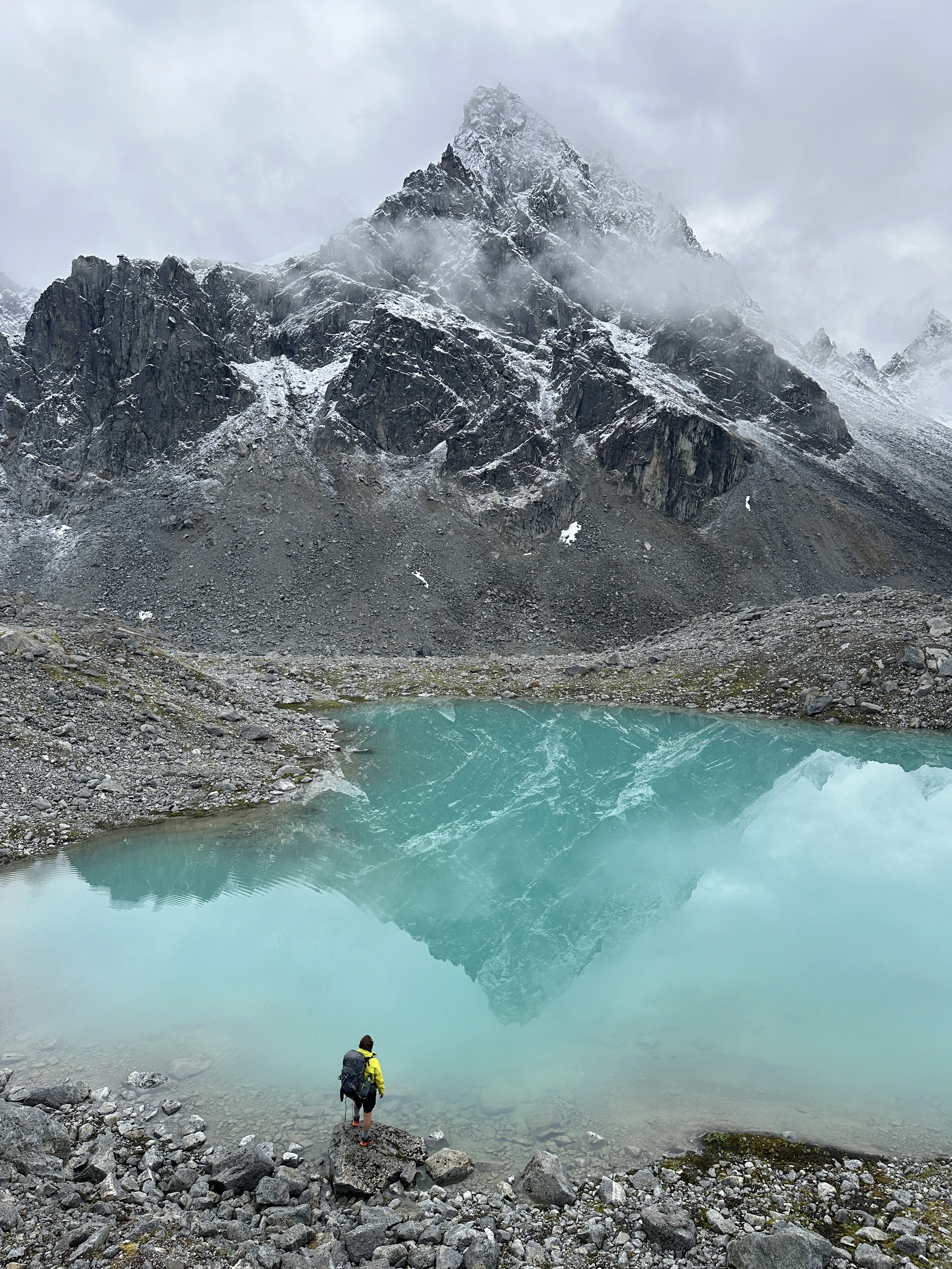
Troublemint reflected in Beryl Lake

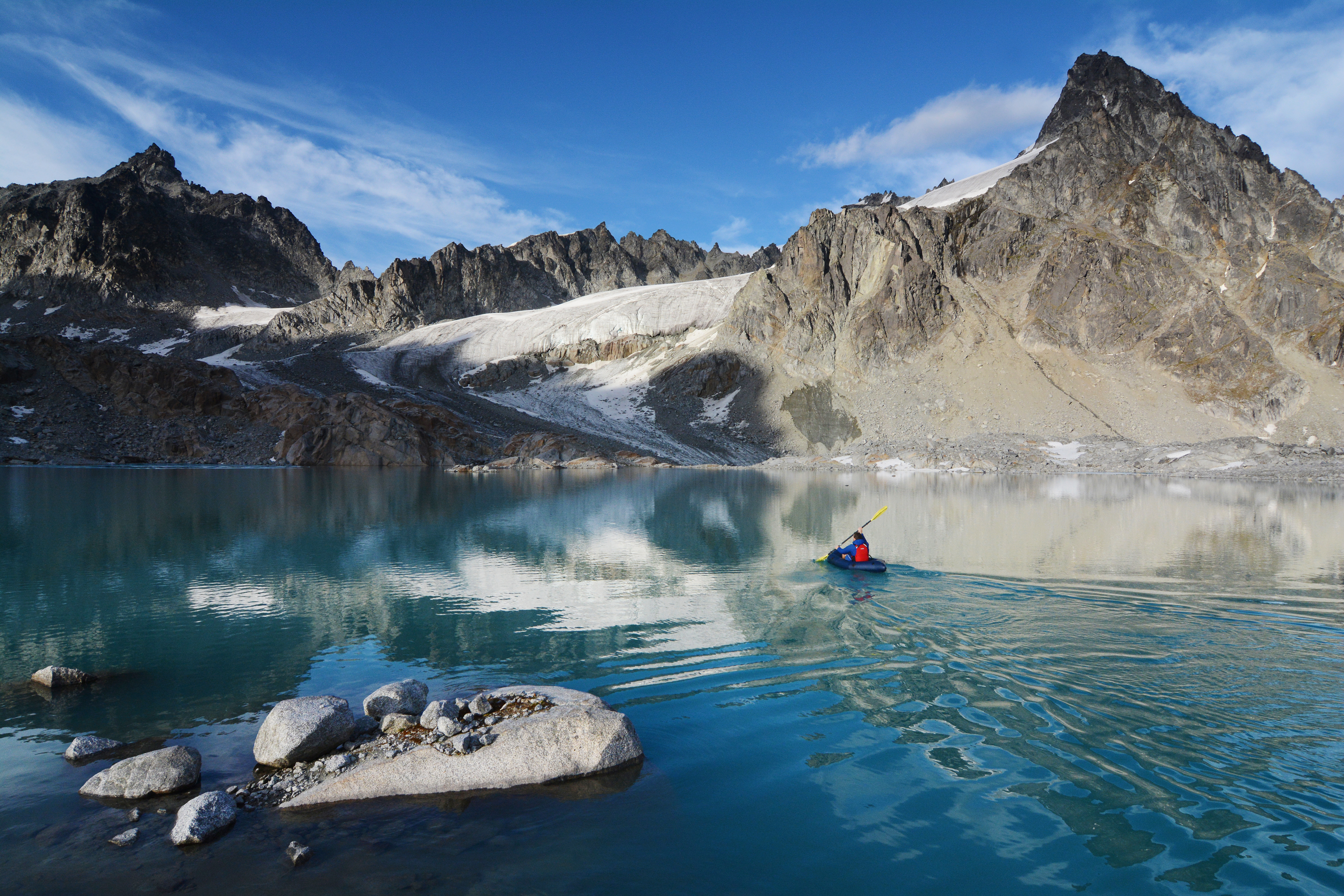
Spearmint Peak (left) and Troublemint (right) from Moonstone Lake

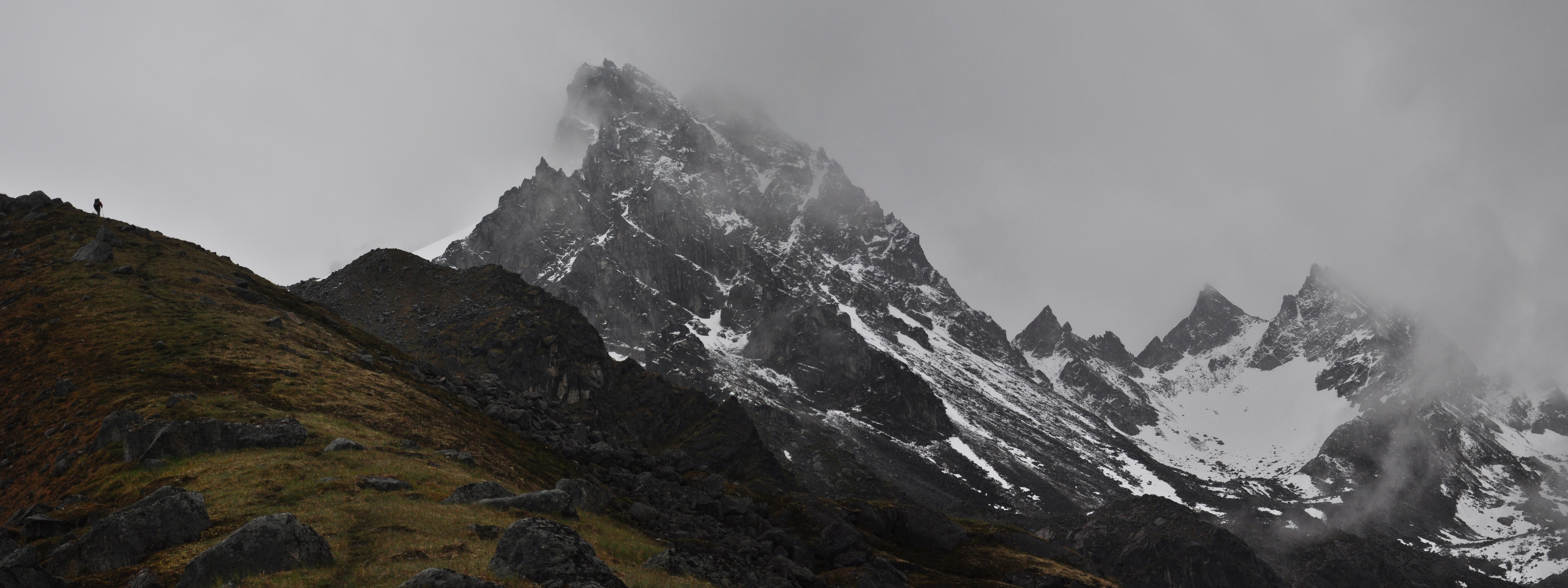
Troublemint (center) and Doublemint (right) from west-northwest

== See also ==
- Geography of Alaska
