= Triplemint Peak =

Mountain in Alaska, United States

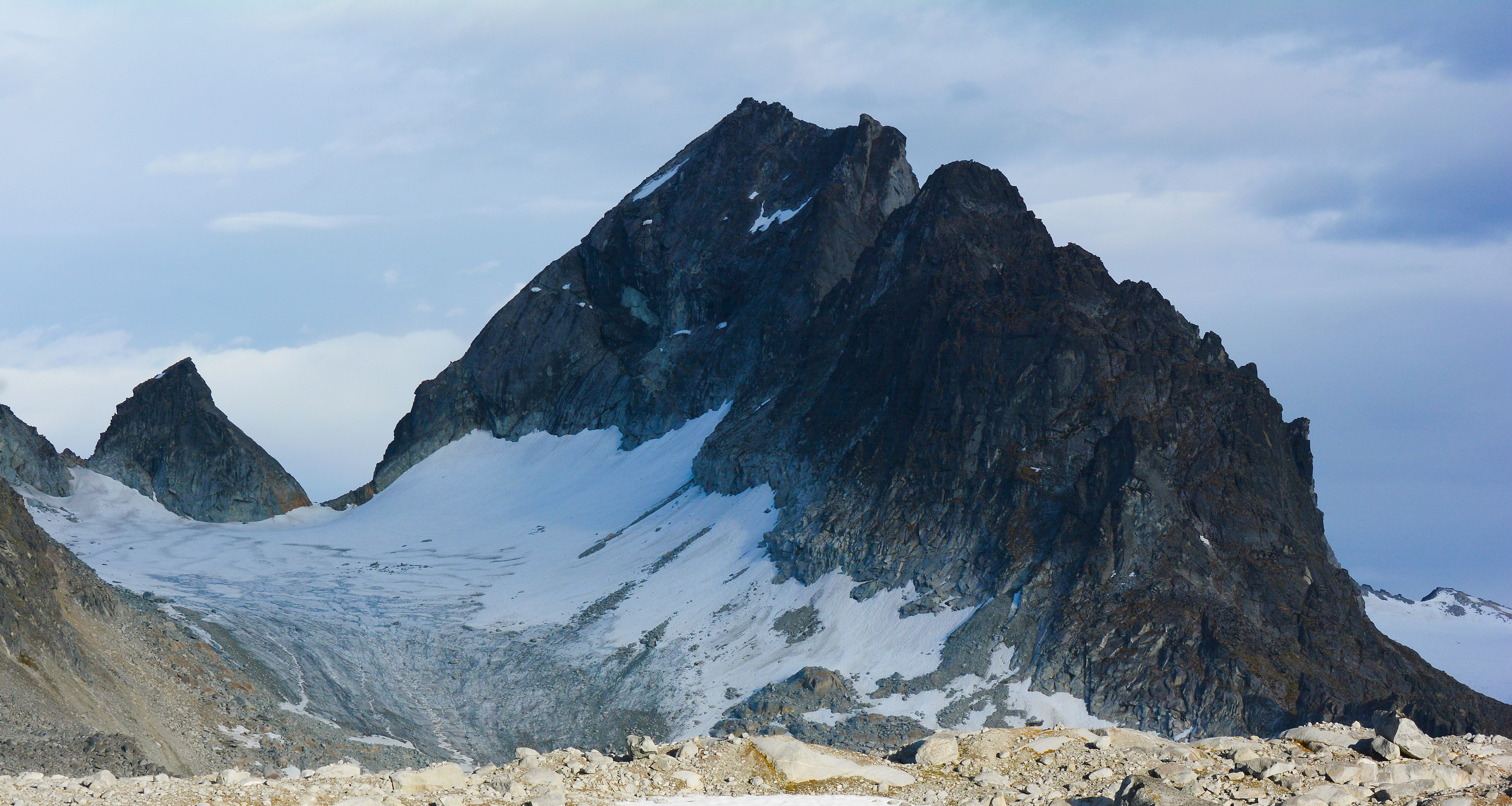
- North aspect

Highest point
- Elevation: 6,332 ft (1,930 m)
- Prominence: 745 ft (227 m)
- Parent peak: Montana Peak (6,949 ft)
- Isolation: 0.93 mi (1.50 km)
- Coordinates: 61°50′36″N 149°02′34″W

Geography
- Location within Alaska
- Country: United States
- State: Alaska
- Borough: Matanuska-Susitna
- Protected area: Hatcher Pass Management Area
- Parent range: Talkeetna Mountains
- Topo map: USGS Anchorage D-6

Triplemint Peak is a 6,332-foot-elevation (1,930-meter) summit in Alaska, United States.

== Description ==
Triplemint Peak is located 19 miles (31 km) north of Palmer, Alaska, in the Talkeetna Mountains and in the Hatcher Pass Management Area of the state park system. Precipitation runoff from this mountain's west slope drains into headwaters of the Little Susitna River, whereas the east side drains into Moose Creek which is a tributary of the Matanuska River. Topographic relief is significant as the summit rises 3,350 feet (1,021 meters) above Little Susitna River in one mile (1.6 km). The nearest higher neighbor is Troublemint Peak approximately one mile to the north. The approach to the peak is via the eight-mile Gold Mint Trail which reaches the Mint Glacier Hut. This mountain's toponym has not been officially adopted by the United States Board on Geographic Names.

== Climate ==
Based on the Köppen climate classification, Triplemint is located in a subarctic climate zone with long, cold, snowy winters, and short cool summers. Winter temperatures can drop below 0 °F with wind chill factors below −10 °F. This climate supports remnants of Glacier G210960E61831N on the south slope and a small unnamed glacier on the north slope. The months of May through June offer the most favorable weather for climbing or viewing.

== See also ==
- Geography of Alaska
- Spearmint Spire

== Gallery ==
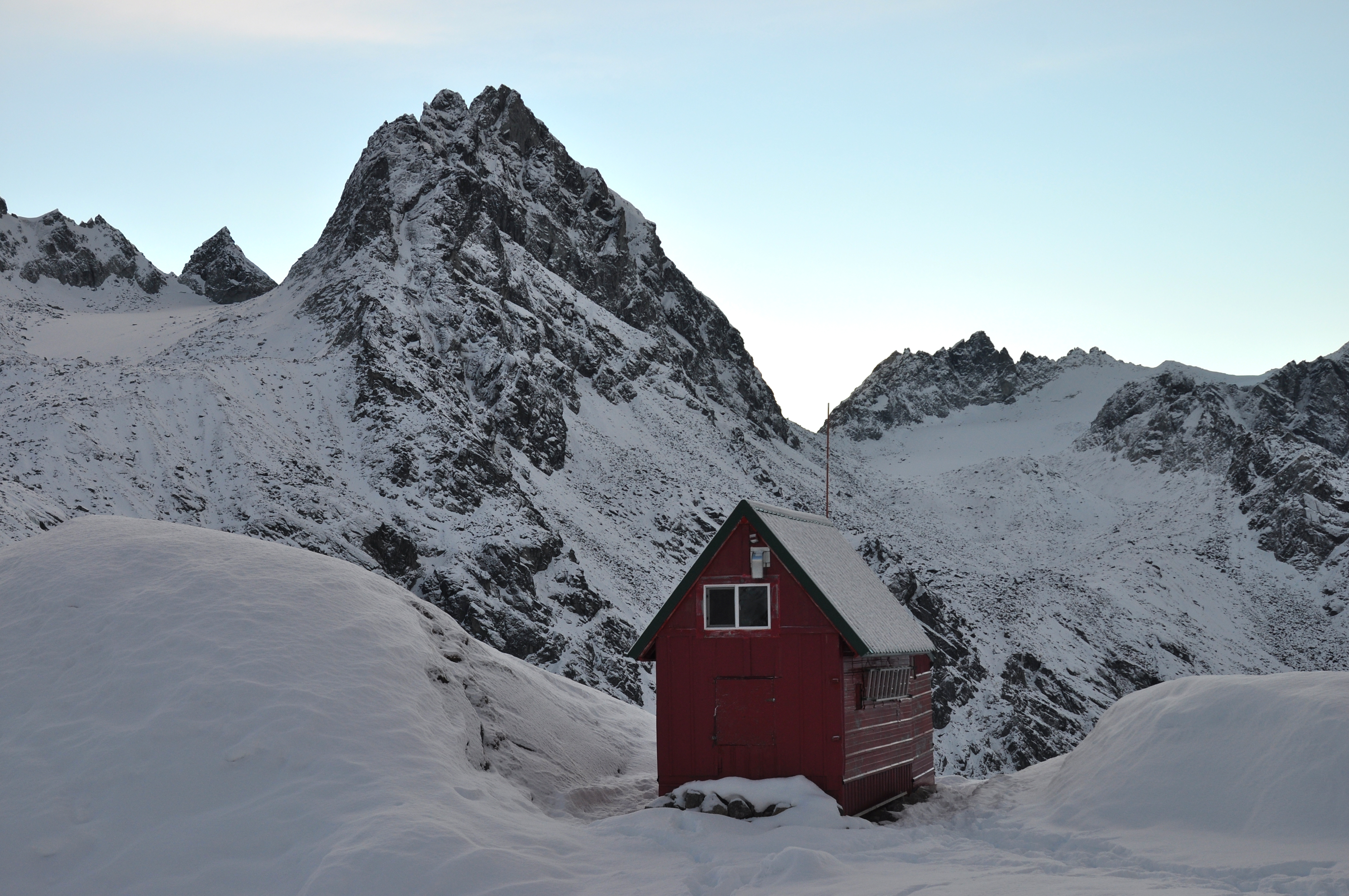
Triplemint and Mint Hut

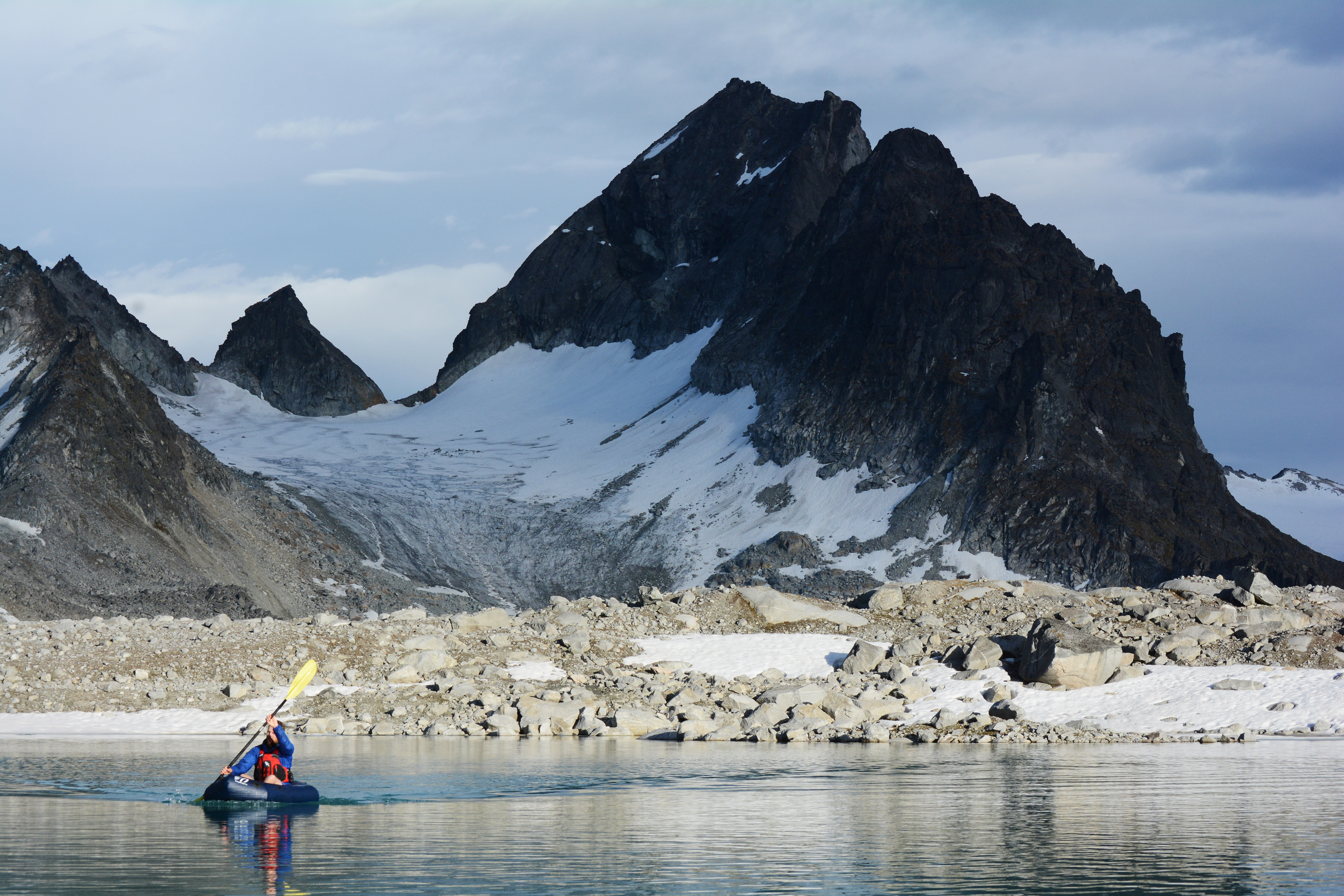
