= Penny Royal Glacier =

Glacier in Alaska, US

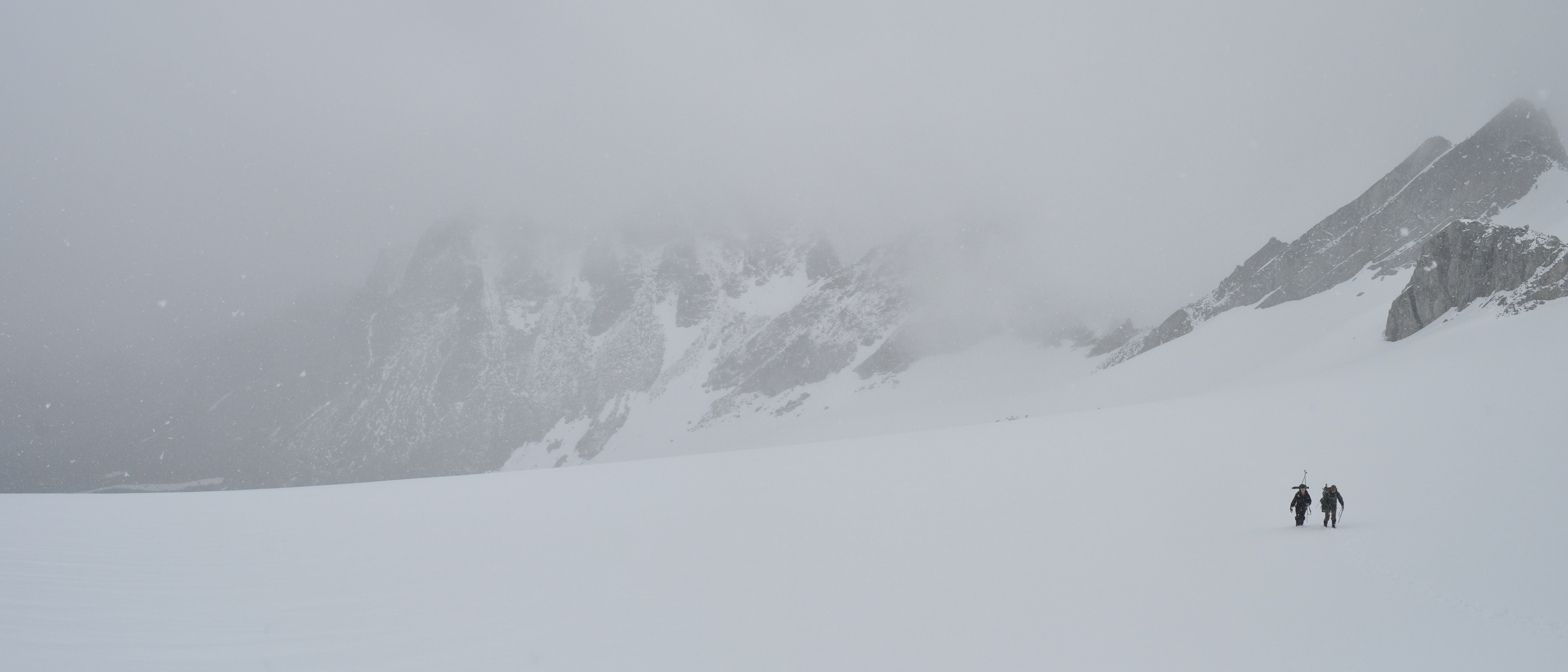
- Hikers cross Penny Royal Glacier during an August snowstorm

- Location within Alaska
- Interactive map of Penny Royal Glacier
- Type: Hanging mountain glacier
- Location: Talkeetna Mountains, Alaska, United States
- Coordinates: 61°51′48″N 149°06′25″W
- Terminus: alpine moraines
- Status: retreating

Penny Royal Glacier is a hanging alpine glacier in the Talkeetna Mountains of Alaska.

== Location and Terrain ==
Penny Royal Glacier sits in the Talkeetna Mountains in an undeveloped wilderness area, at an elevation between approximately 4,600-6,000 ft. Penny Royal is an alpine glacier surrounded by mountains, cliffs, and glacial valleys. The glacier can receive snowfall year-round.

== Recreation ==
No developed roads or paths lead to Penny Royal Glacier, though it is frequented by backcountry and wilderness enthusiasts. The glacier is most often accessed from the steep pass between Penny Royal Glacier and Bomber Glacier, from the valley floor at its terminus, or from the Backdoor Gap pass, which separates the glacier from Mint Valley. Penny Royal Glacier lies on the informal "Bomber Traverse" wilderness hiking route through the Talkeetna Mountains. Mountaineers may cross it en route to nearby peaks, and the glacier can be skied. Visitors are cautioned to be aware of the potential existence of dangerous crevasses, moulins, and bergschrunds, which may come and go with the movement of the glacier.

The Bomber Glacier derives its name from a historical event. It originates from the remnants of a TB-29 Superfortress, which crashed onto the glacier during a training mission in 1957, resulting in the loss of six out of the ten crew members. Situated within a remote and rugged terrain of mountains to the north of Palmer, Alaska, the aircraft remains scattered across the icy landscape, undisturbed since its fateful landing over six decades ago.
