= Talkeetna Mountains =

Mountain range in Alaska

- Dghelaay tahwt’aene
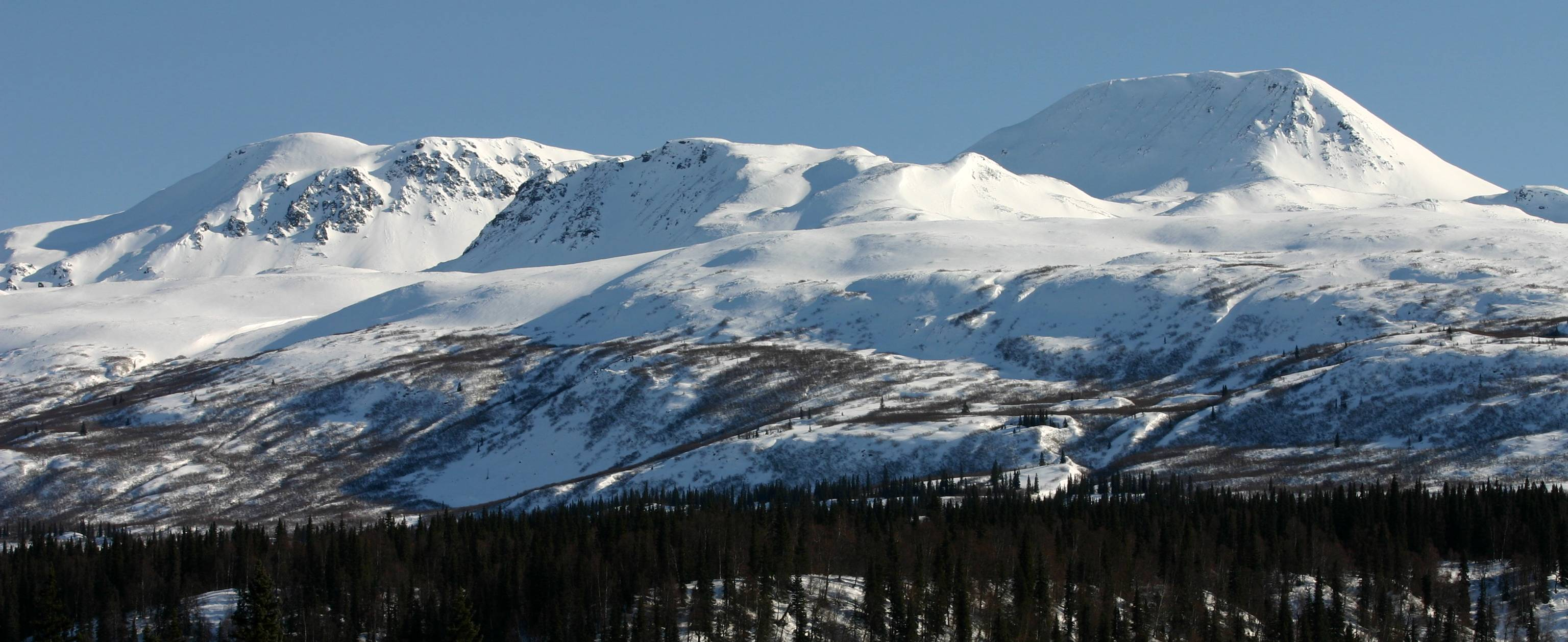
- Talkeetna Mountains, from the Parks Highway

Highest point
- Peak: Sovereign Mountain
- Elevation: 8,849 ft (2,697 m)
- Coordinates: 62°22′22″N 148°43′46″W

Geography
- Location within Alaska
- Country: United States
- State: Alaska
- Range coordinates: 62°2′N 147°54′W

The Talkeetna Mountains (Dghelaay tahwt’aene in Ahtna) (62°2′N 147°54′W) are a mountain range in Alaska. The Matanuska and Susitna River valleys, with towns such as Trapper Creek, Talkeetna, Wasilla, Palmer, Sutton, and Chickaloon, roughly bound the Talkeetnas in the westerly parts of the range. Sovereign Mountain rises to 8,849 feet (2,697 m) in the remote and heavily glaciated central part of the range.

== Appearance ==
The east side of the range fronts a broad, about 100 miles (160 km) wide, lake-studded lowland of forests and swamps, across which rises the gigantic Mount Wrangell (14,163 feet (4,317 m)) volcanic edifice. Alaska Highway 4 runs northward through this lowland. Hundreds of miles to the west Alaska Highway 3 runs along the western side of the Talkeetna range, with the Alaska Range directly west.

Alaska Highway 1, running along the southern front of the Talkeetna Mountains, lies mainly in a valley marking a tectonic divide between the Jurassic and Cretaceous rocks of the accretionary wedge, island-arc, and basement rocks in the Peninsular terrane (and other terranes forming the Talkeetna Mountains), and the Chugach Mountains in the Chugach terrane to the south. The range stretches as much as a hundred miles north to south. Alaska Highway 8, seasonal and unpaved, passes over highlands rising to above 4,000 feet (1,200 m), north of the Talkeetnas.

Hatcher Pass, a seasonal highway pass across the southwestern corner of the range, provides views into the glaciated interior of the range, and is the location of Independence Mine State Historical Park.

== Fauna ==
The majority of the land is state-owned, and it is home to many large mammals including grizzly/brown bears, black bears, moose, caribou, wolves, wolverines, and Dall sheep.

== Notable peaks ==
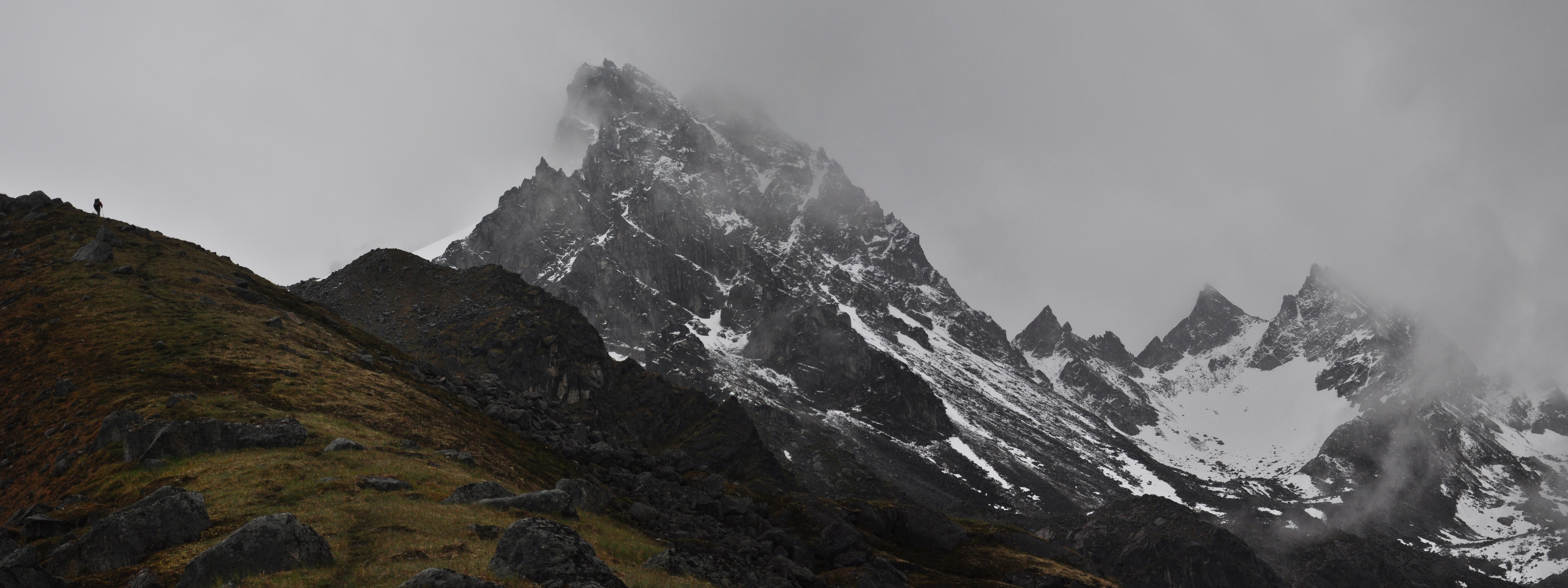
Troublemint and Doublemint peaks

- Sovereign Mountain (8849 ft.)
- White Knight Peak (8450 ft.)
- Tyrant's Tor (8150 ft.)
- Mount Apollo (7950 ft.)
- Mount Monarch (7108 ft.)
- Granite Peak (6729 ft.)
- Lala Mountain (6620 ft.)
- Gunsight Mountain (6441 ft.)
- Mount Watana (6255 ft.)
- Sheep Mountain (6223 ft.)
- Government Peak (4781 ft.)

== Notable glaciers ==
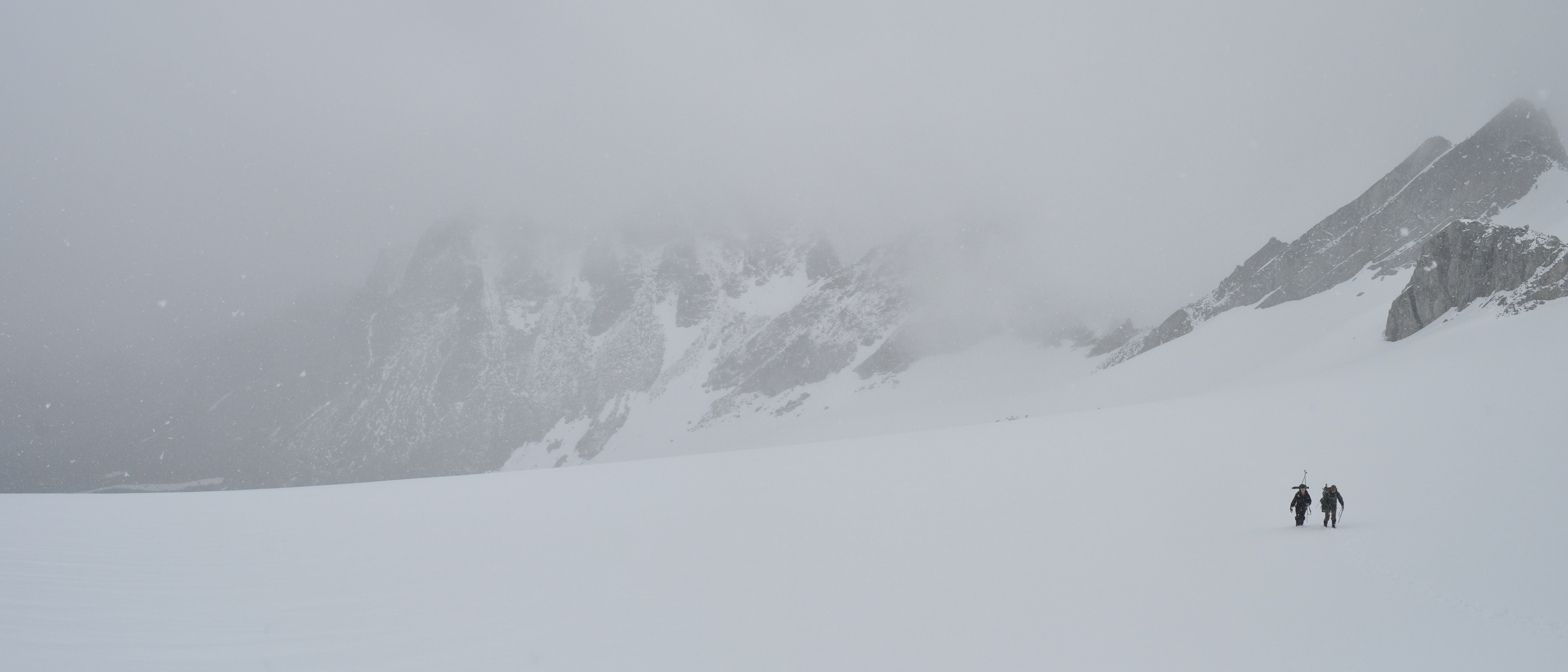
Penny Royal Glacier

- Chickaloon Glacier
- Talkeetna Glacier
- Mint Glacier
- Snowbird Glacier
- Bomber Glacier
- Penny Royal Glacier

== Gallery ==
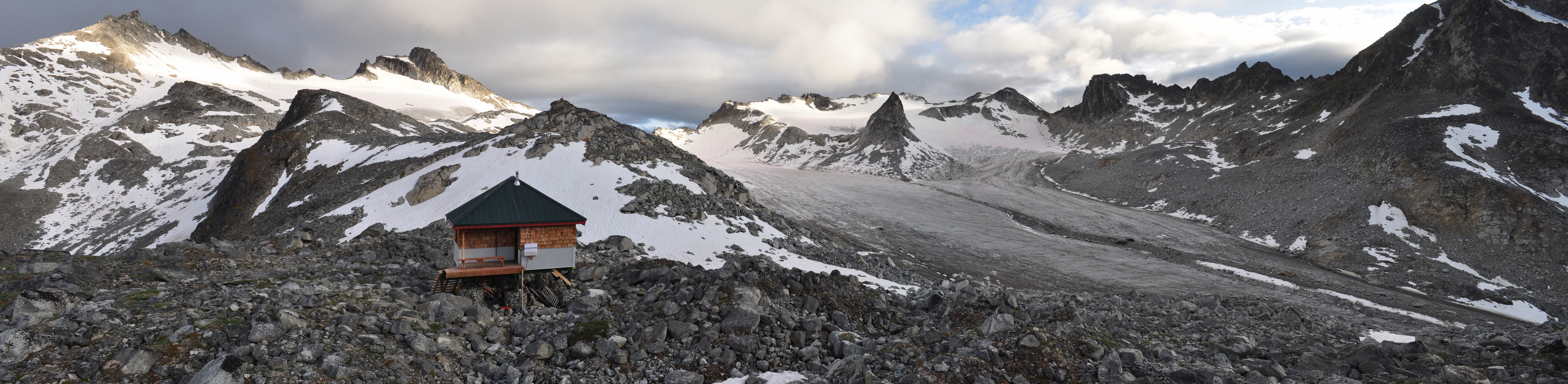
The Snowbird Glacier Hut

Upper Reed Lake time lapse video

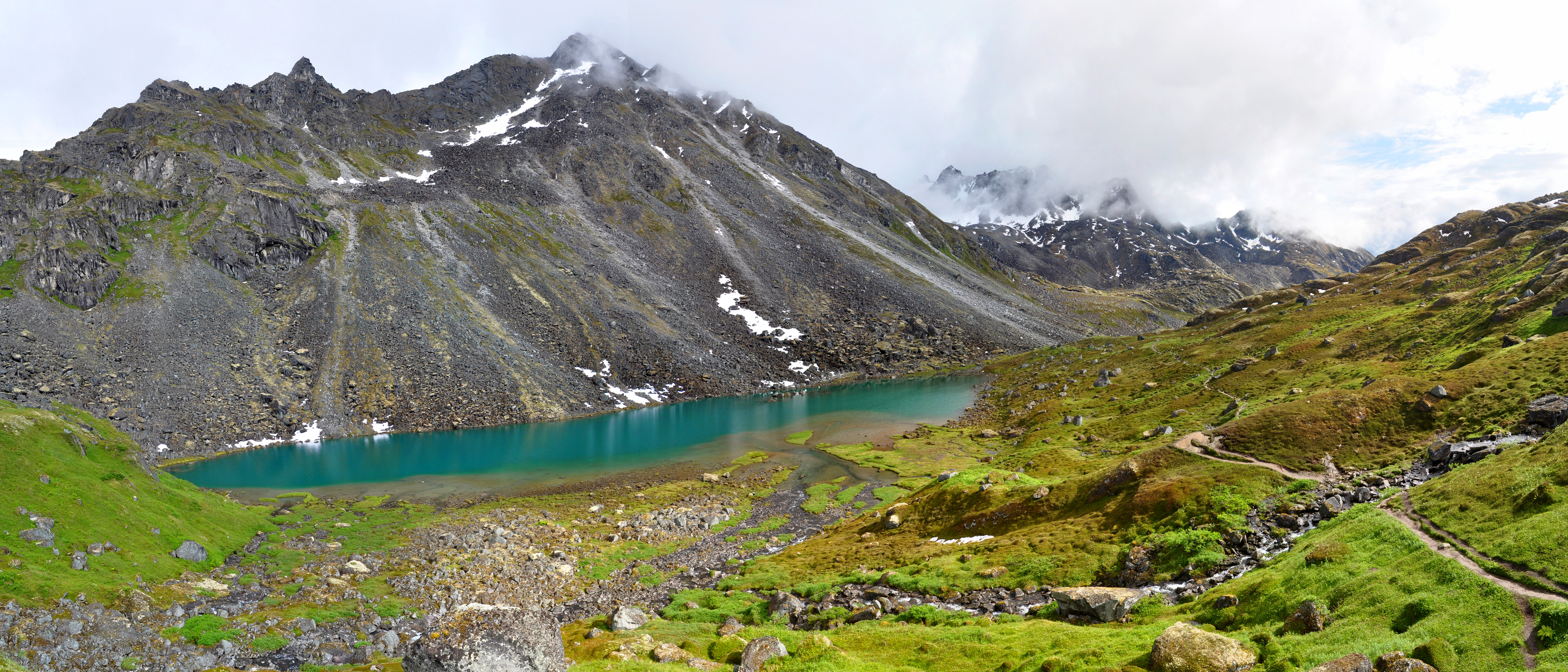
Lower Reed Lake, on the popular Reed Lakes trail

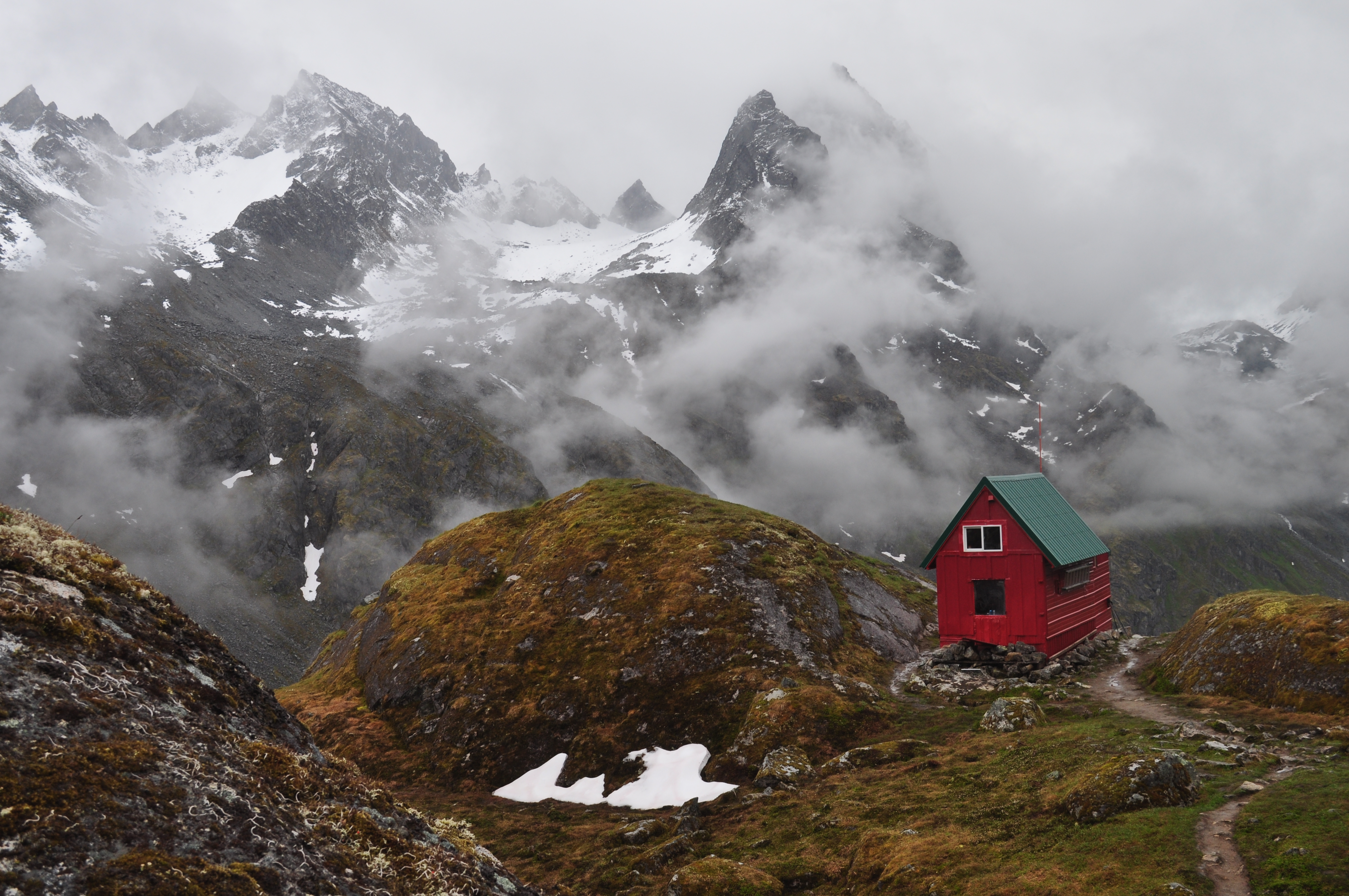
The Mint Glacier Hut

== See also ==
- Matanuska Formation
