= Ahtna language =

Endangered Athabaskan language of Alaska

Ahtna
- Copper River, Mednovskiy
- Koht’aene Kenaege', Atnakenaege’
- Native to: United States
- Region: Alaska (Copper River region)
- Ethnicity: 500 Ahtna (1995)
- Native speakers: 15 (2020); 30 (2011)
- Language family: Na-Dené: Athabaskan; Northern Athabaskan; Ahtna
- Writing system: Latin (Ahtna alphabet)

Official status
- Official language in: Alaska

Language codes
- ISO 639-3: aht
- Glottolog: ahte1237
- ELP: Ahtna
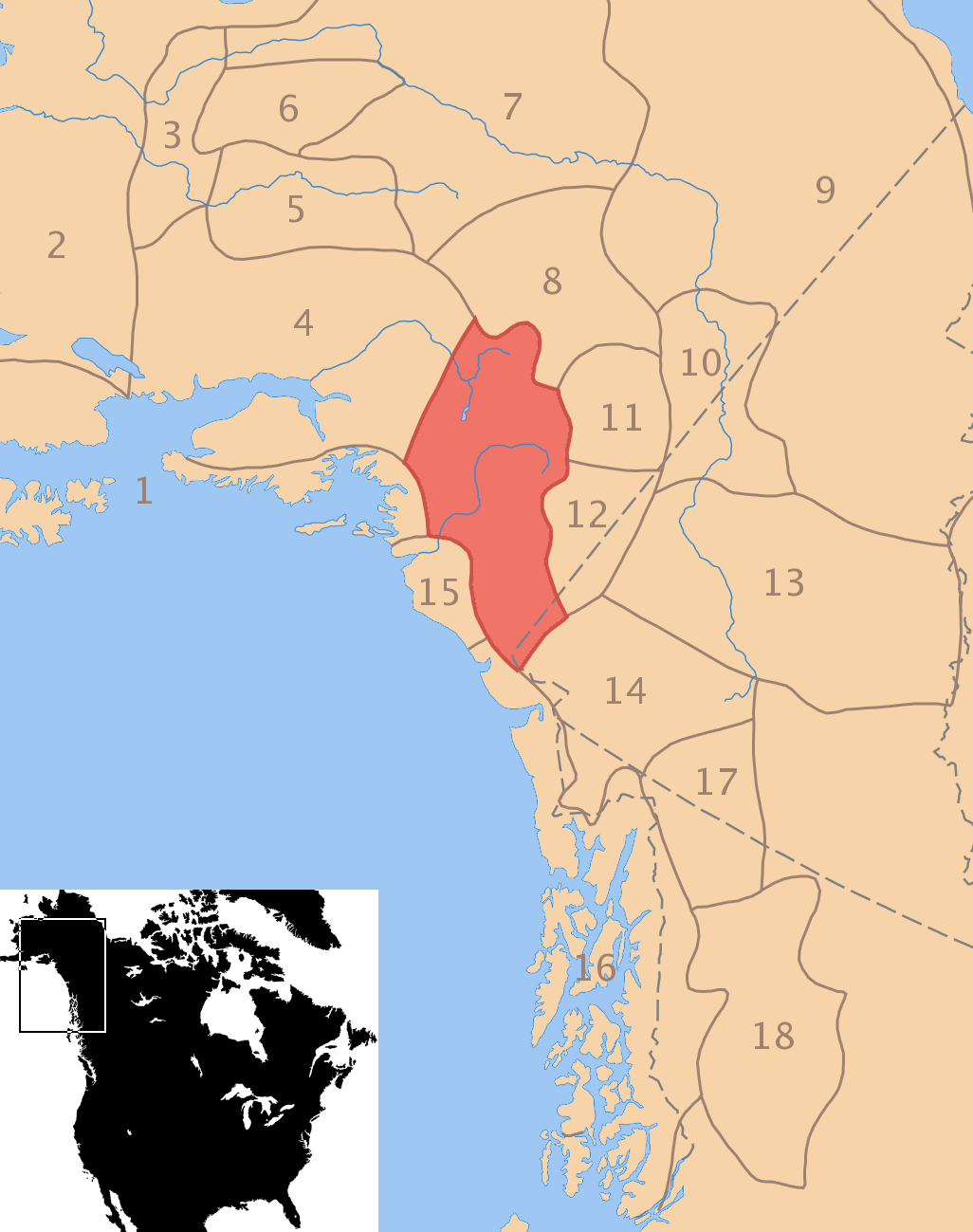
- Pre-contact distribution of Ahtna

- Ahtna is classified as Critically Endangered by the UNESCO Atlas of the World's Languages in Danger.
- Coordinates: 62°10′N 143°49′W

Ahtna or Ahtena (/ˈɑːtnə/, from At Na 'Copper River') is the Na-Dené language of the Ahtna ethnic group of the Copper River area of Alaska. The language is also known as Copper River or Mednovskiy.

The Ahtna language consists of four different dialects: Upper, Central, Lower, and Western. Three of the four are still spoken today. Ahtna is closely related to Dena'ina.

The similar name Atnah occurs in the journals of Simon Fraser and other early European diarists in what is now British Columbia as a reference to the Tsilhqot'in people, another Northern Athapaskan group.

== Classification ==
Ahtna is classified as belonging to the Northern Athabaskan languages, a subgrouping of the Athabaskan languages.

== History ==
Ahtna is one of the eleven Athabaskan languages native to Alaska. The Ahtna language comes from the proto-Athabaskan language, believed to have evolved 5,000 to 10,000 years ago when humans migrated from Eurasia to North America over the Bering land bridge (Beringia), when it was dried up and exposed creating a natural land bridge. Many indigenous Native American languages are thought to have derived from this proto-Athabaskan language. Ahtna and other Athabaskan languages, like Navajo, have many similarities, due to their common ancestry. The Ahtna language has changed very much and very often, and it is still changing today. Within the past century more than one hundred words have made their way into the Ahtna vocabulary mostly due to influence from English. Contact with Russians influenced the Ahtna language with many Russian loanwords being introduced. With contact from English speakers, especially recently, English words have also been introduced. Some words are also borrowed from the Alaskan Tlingit and Alutiiq native languages.

== Geographic distribution ==
The Ahtna region consists of the Copper River Basin and the Wrangell Mountains. The Ahtna Region is bordered by the Nutzotin river in the Northeast and the Alaska Range in the North. The Talkeetna Mountains are to the Chugach Mountains are to the South. The Upper Ahtna live on the upper portion of the Copper River, The Middle or Central Ahtna live slightly down river from there, The Lower Ahtna live near the mouth of the Copper River, which opens into the Gulf of Alaska, and the Western Ahtna live to the West of the River.

The Ahtna people live on and near traditional villages. There are eight villages within the Ahtna Region: Cantwell, Chistochina, Chitina, Copper Center, Gakona, Gulkana, Mentasta and Tazlina. They are all recognized federally.

== Revitalization ==
There are 15 elderly speakers out of a population of 500, and the language is facing extinction.

The subsistence and fishing-rights activist Katie John (1915–2013) of Mentasta helped develop an Ahtna alphabet in the 1970s and recorded a pronunciation guide of the Mentasta dialect.

In 2012 a facing-bilingual collection of poetry in Ahtna and English, The Indian Prophet, was published by poet John Smelcer.

In a revitalization program, the Ya Ne Dah Ah School in Sutton, Alaska teaches the Ahtna language as a part of its curriculum.

As of 2010, a digital archiving project of Ahtna was underway.

== Dialects and bands ==
There are four main dialect divisions and eight bands (tribal unions):

- Lower Ahtna (endonym Atnahwt'aene)
  - Chitina/Taral Band
  - Tonsina/Klutina Band
- Central Ahtna or Middle Ahtna (endonym Dan'ehwt'aene)
  - Gulkona/Gakona Band
- Western Ahtna (own name Tsaay Hwt'aene)
  - Tyone/Mendeltna Band
  - Cantwell/Denali Band
- Upper Ahtna (endonym Tatl'ahwt'aene)
  - Sanford River/Chistochina Band
  - Slana/Batzulnetas Band
  - Mentasta Band

== Phonology ==
=== Consonants ===
The consonants in Kari's IPA phonology and practical orthography are shown in the following table.

		Labial	Alveolar			Velar	Uvular	Glottal
		Labial	plain	sibilant	lateral	Velar	Uvular	Glottal
Nasals		m ⟨m⟩	n ⟨n⟩			ŋ ⟨ng⟩		
Plosive/ affricate	plain	p ⟨b⟩	t ⟨d⟩	ts ⟨dz⟩	tɬ ⟨dl⟩	k ⟨g⟩	q ⟨gg⟩	ʔ ⟨'⟩
Plosive/ affricate	aspirated	pʰ ⟨p⟩	tʰ ⟨t⟩	tsʰ ⟨ts⟩	tɬʰ ⟨tl⟩	kʰ ⟨c⟩	qʰ ⟨k⟩	
Plosive/ affricate	ejective		tʼ ⟨t'⟩	tsʼ ⟨ts'⟩	tɬʼ ⟨tl'⟩	kʼ ⟨c'⟩	qʼ ⟨k'⟩	
Fricatives	voiceless	hʷ ⟨hw⟩		s ⟨s⟩	ɬ ⟨ł⟩	x ⟨yh⟩	χ ⟨x⟩	h ⟨h⟩
Fricatives	voiced	v ⟨v⟩		z ⟨z⟩	l ⟨l⟩	ɣ ⟨y⟩	ʁ ⟨gh⟩	

=== Vowels ===
The vowels in Kari's practical orthography and phonology are as follows.

	Front		Back	
	Short	Long	Short	Long
High	ɪ ⟨i⟩	iː ⟨ii⟩	ʊ ⟨u⟩	uː ⟨uu⟩
Mid	ɛ ⟨e⟩		ɔ ⟨o⟩	oː ⟨oo⟩
Low	ɐ ⟨a⟩	æ ⟨ae⟩		ɑː ⟨aa⟩

There is some variation in pronunciation of words according to dialect.

== Grammar ==
Athabaskan languages are primarily prefixing. Many prefixes are presented together. There is limited suffixation and often one word has as much meaning as an English language sentence. Verbs are very complex therefore creating many different meanings or analysis of verbs. Some verbs include syntactic principles in addition to and/or replacement of morphological principles when constructing a word.

=== Possessives ===
Possession is indicated by prefixes such as s- "my", u- or yu'- "his/her", ne- "our"; as in snaan "my mother", unaan (or yu'naan) "his/her mother", nenaan "our mother".

=== Verb themes ===
Verbs are primarily prefixing. There are often six or more prefixes before the stem and then one or more suffixes. (1a) displays a surface form in Ahtna spelling while (1b) is the verb theme. Three prefixes are present that have to be listed with the stem to make up the form. Anything adjacent in a verb theme can be separated by morphemes in the forms surface. Verb themes display what elements should be listed in a dictionary for a speaker to be able to reconstruct the verb. '#' displays an important word-internal boundary known as a disjunct boundary. '+' indicates a morpheme boundary.

ta # d + l + dlok'
{into water} # QUAL + CL + laugh
"Water is gurgling." (surface form)

In the Ahtna language the verb typically goes after the noun.

=== Noun modification ===
In the Ahtna language, modifiers usually go after the noun they modify. Examples of this include the name of the deity or trickster figure Saghani Ggaay, where saghani is the noun "raven" and ggaay the adjective "little, small" or in the term nen ten "permafrost", a combination of nen "land, ground" and ten "frozen". This word order is also seen in place names such as Dghelaay Ce'e "Denali/Mount McKinley", literally "Biggest Mountain", and Ben Ce'e "Lake Susitna", literally "Big Lake".

== Vocabulary ==
=== Comparison ===
The comparison of some animal names in the three Athabaskan languages:

Ahtna	Tanacross	Lower Tanana	meaning
udzih	wudzih	bedzeyh	caribou
ggax	gah	gwx	rabbit
tsa'	tsá'	tso'	beaver
dzen	dzenh	dzenh	muskrat
niduuyi	niidûuy	niduuy	lynx
debae	demee	deba	Dall sheep
sos	shos	sresr	bear
dliigi	dlêg	dlega	squirrel
łuk'ae	łuk'a	łuk'a	salmon
