= Higher Spire =

Mountain in Alaska, United States

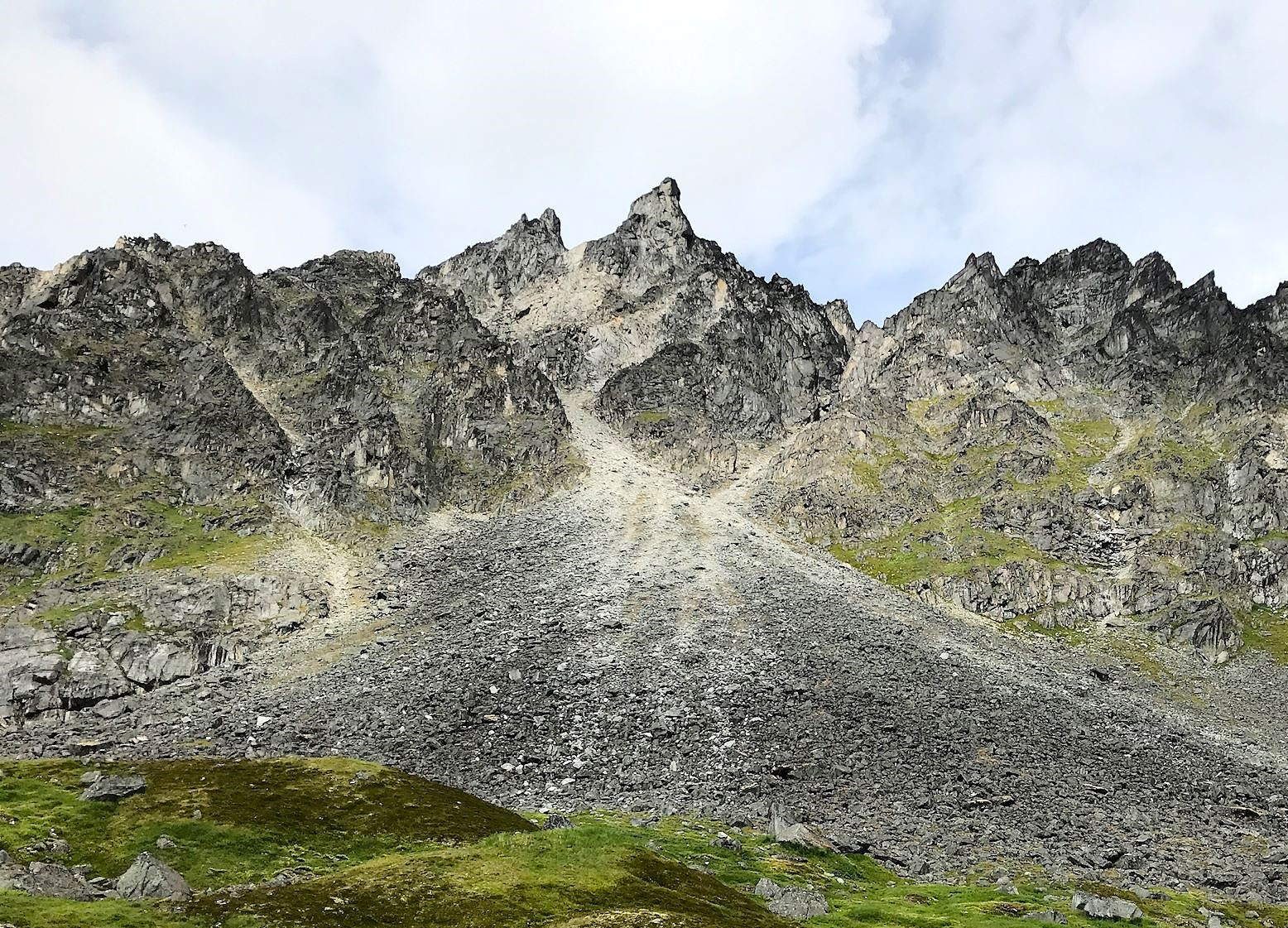
- Southeast aspect, from Reed Lakes

Highest point
- Elevation: 6,135 ft (1,870 m)
- Prominence: 935 ft (285 m)
- Parent peak: Lynx Peak (6,536 ft)
- Isolation: 1.89 mi (3.04 km)
- Coordinates: 61°51′00″N 149°10′51″W

Geography
- Location within Alaska
- Country: United States
- State: Alaska
- Borough: Matanuska-Susitna
- Protected area: Hatcher Pass Management Area
- Parent range: Talkeetna Mountains
- Topo map: USGS Anchorage D-6

Higher Spire is a 6,135-foot-elevation (1,870-meter) summit in Alaska, United States.

== Description ==
Higher Spire is located 20 miles (32 km) north of Palmer, Alaska, in the Talkeetna Mountains and in the Hatcher Pass Management Area of the state park system. Precipitation runoff from this peak drains south to the Little Susitna River via Reed Creek, whereas the north side drains to Bartholf Creek which is a tributary of the Kashwitna River. Topographic relief is significant as the summit rises 2,300 feet (701 meters) above Lower Reed Lake in 0.75 miles (1.21 km). The nearest higher neighbor is Lynx Peak two miles (3.2 km) to the east. The Snowbird Hut on the northern edge of the Snowbird Glacier provides shelter and access for climbing Higher Spire and Lower Spire. This peak's toponym has been featured in publications since at least 1969, but it has not been officially adopted by the United States Board on Geographic Names.

== Lower Spire ==
Lower Spire is set 0.38 miles (0.61 km) southwest of Higher Spire. It reaches an elevation of 6,129 ft (1,868 m) and has a topographical prominence of 229 feet (70 m). It is also set above the Snowbird Glacier.

== Climate ==
Based on the Köppen climate classification, Higher Spire is located in a subarctic climate zone with long, cold, snowy winters, and short cool summers. Winter temperatures can drop below 0 °F with wind chill factors below −10 °F. This climate supports the Snowbird Glacier on the west slope of the peak. The months of May through June offer the most favorable weather for climbing or viewing.

== See also ==
- Geography of Alaska
- Hatcher Pass

== Gallery ==
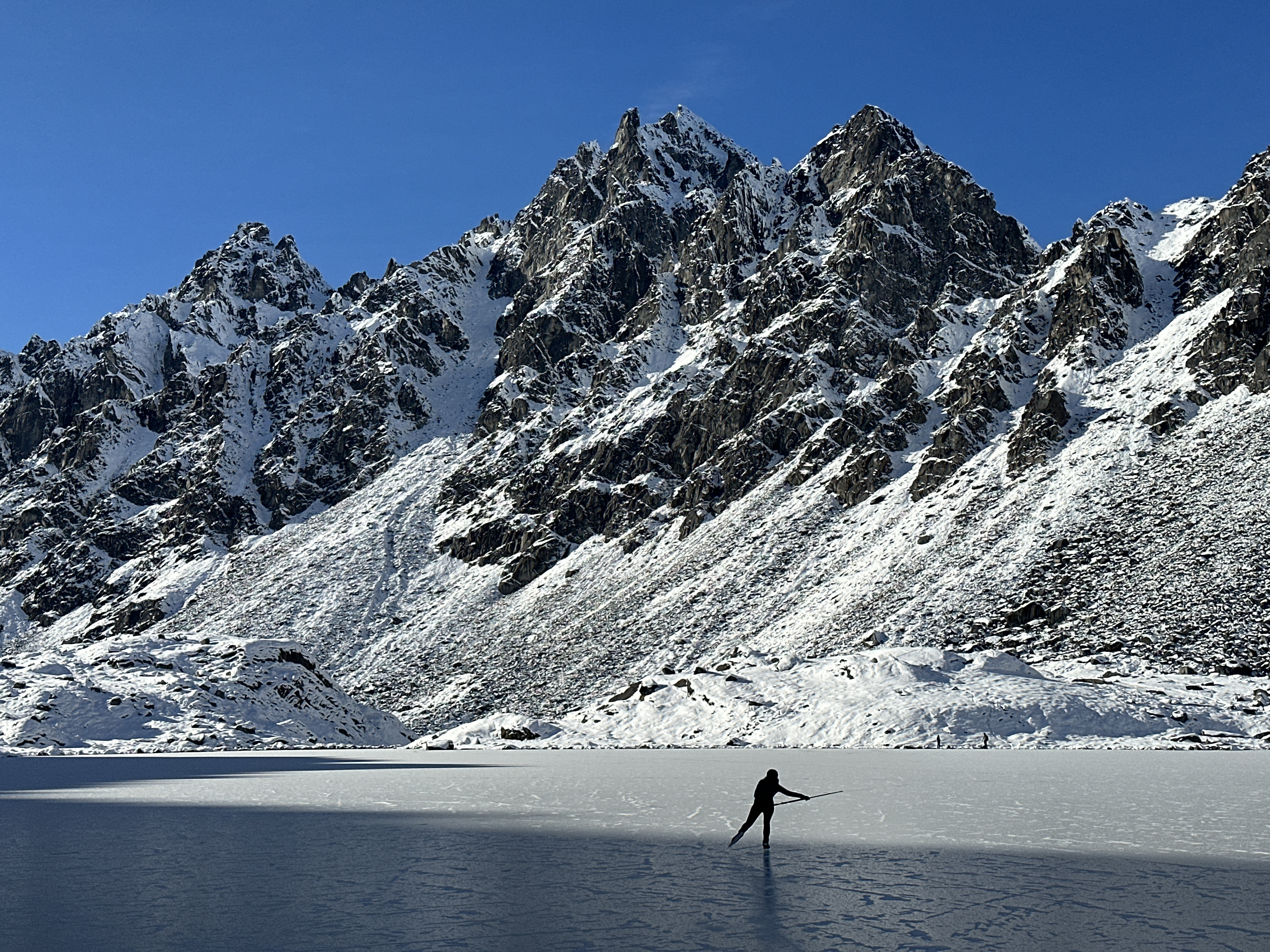
East aspect of Higher Spire centered above Upper Reed Lake

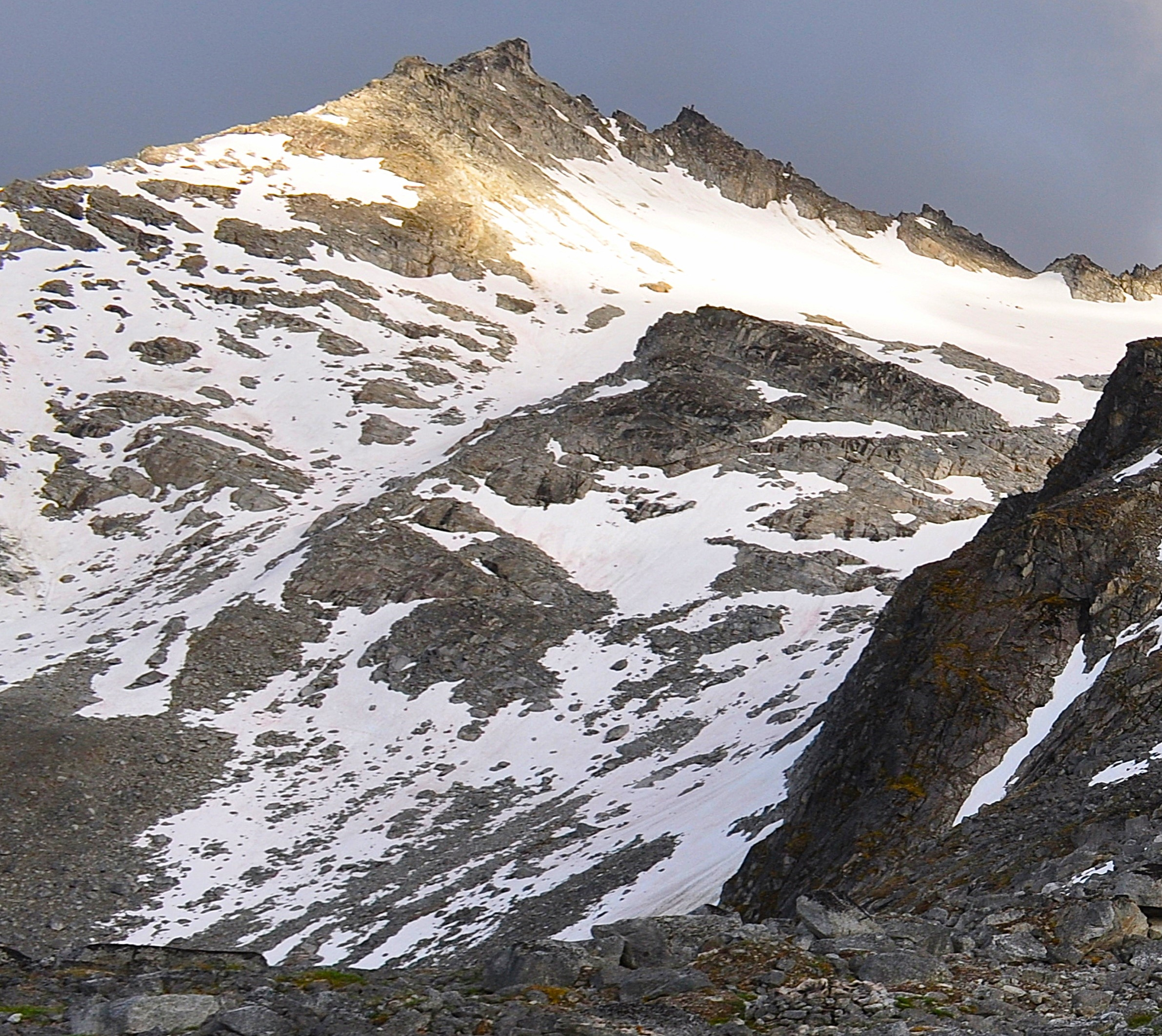
North aspect

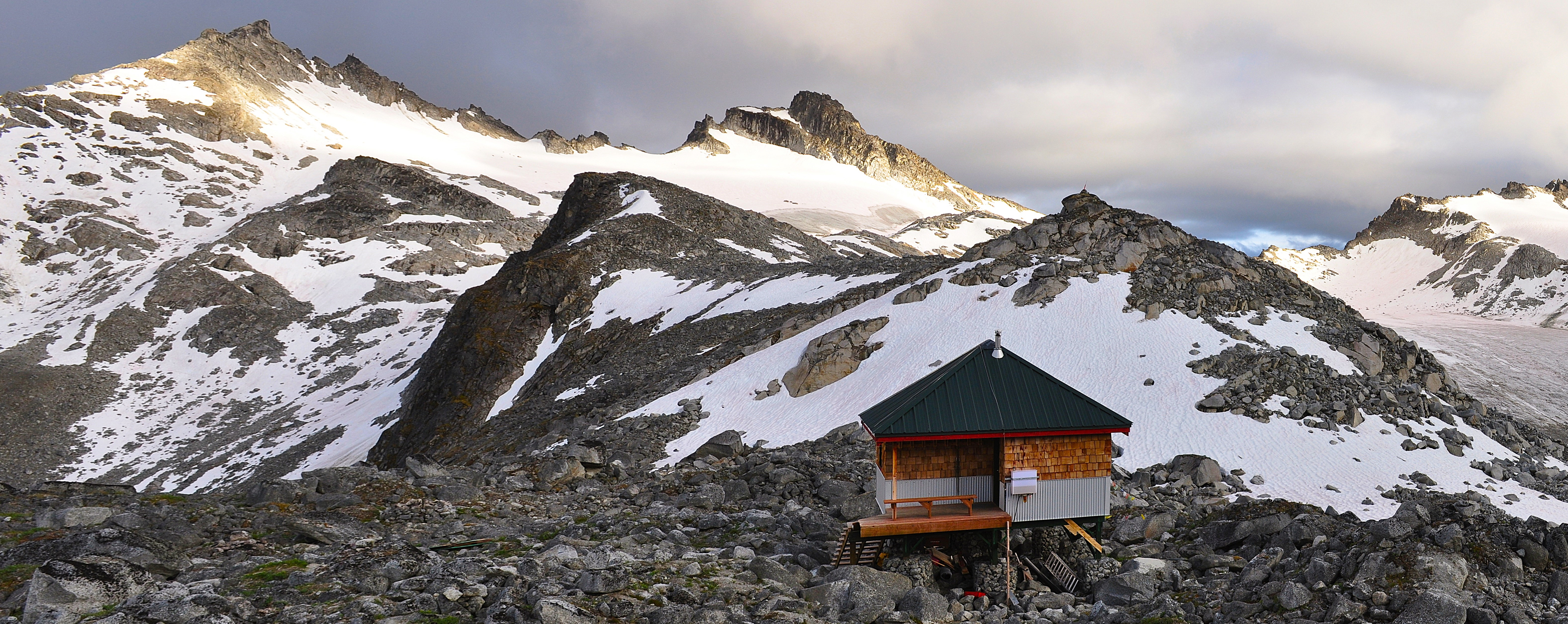
Snowbird Hut with Higher Spire (upper left) and Lower Spire (center, top)

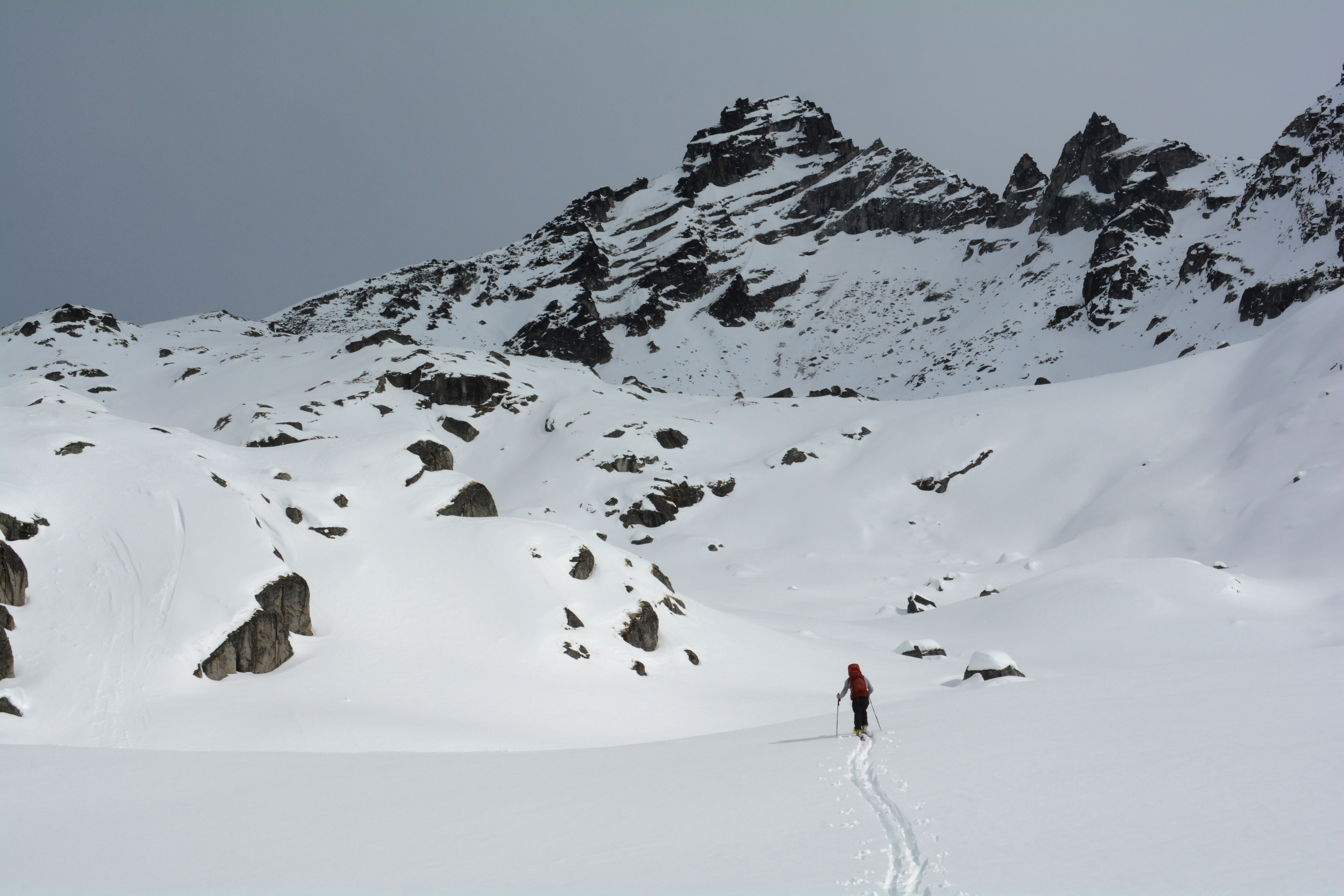
Southeast aspect of Lower Spire
