= Tenmile Run (Susquehanna River tributary) =

Coordinates: 41.025°N 76.328°W

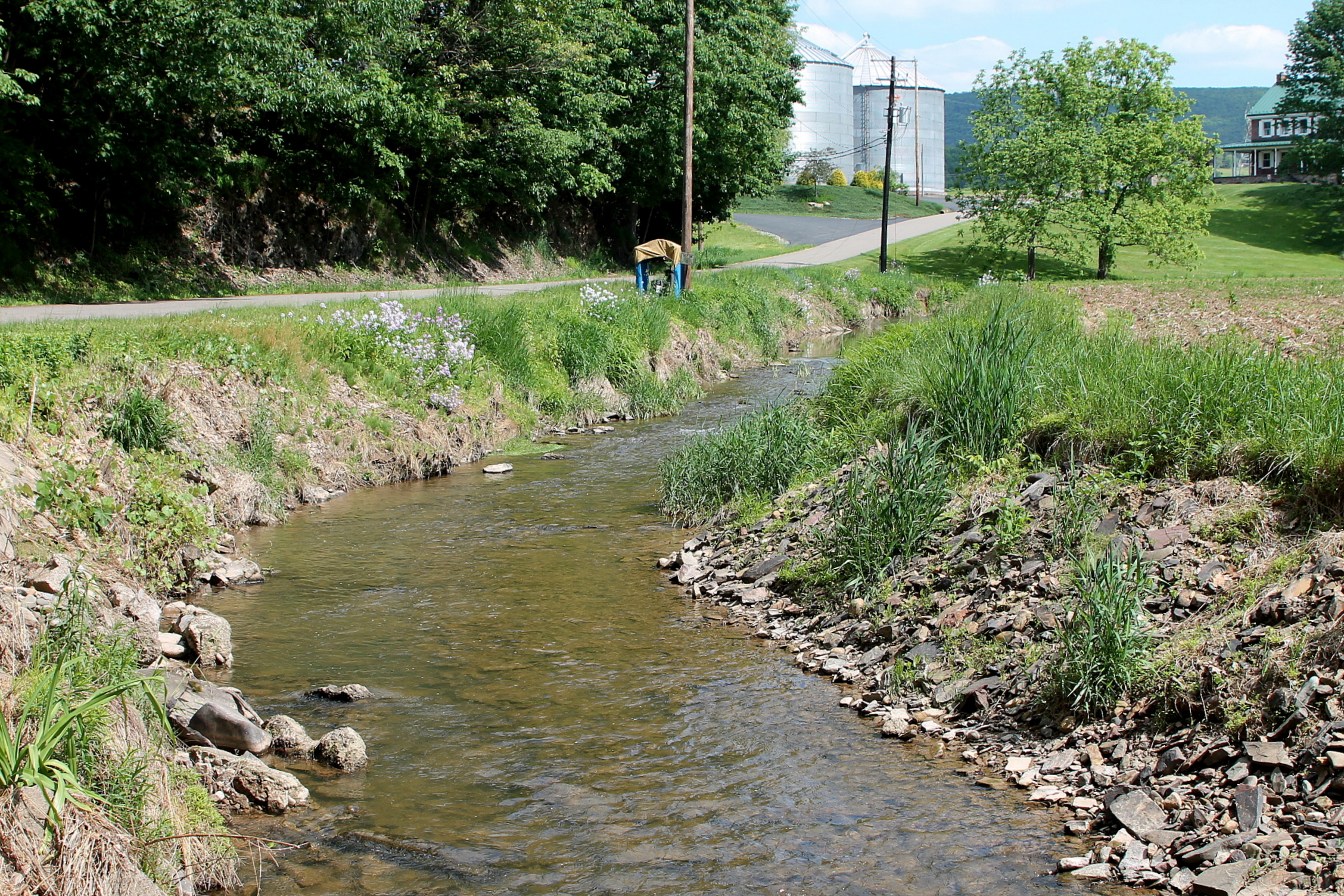
- Tenmile Run in its lower reaches looking upstream
- Etymology: named for its location near a ten-mile post in a road

Physical characteristics
- Source
  - location: Mifflin Township, Columbia County, Pennsylvania
- Mouth
  - location: Susquehanna River in Mifflin Township, Columbia County, Pennsylvania
  - elevation: 463 ft (141 m)
- Length: 6.1 mi (9.8 km)
- Basin size: 8.24 mi^{2} (21.3 km^{2})

Tenmile Run (also known as Ten Mile Run or Ten-mile Run) is a tributary of the Susquehanna River in eastern Columbia County, Pennsylvania, in the United States. It is 6.1 miles (9.8 km) long and is entirely in Mifflin Township. The stream's watershed has an area of 8.24 square miles. The first settlers in the area arrived in the late 1700s and a number of mills have been built on the stream. It is designated as a High-Quality Coldwater Fishery and as Class A Wild Trout Waters.

== Course ==
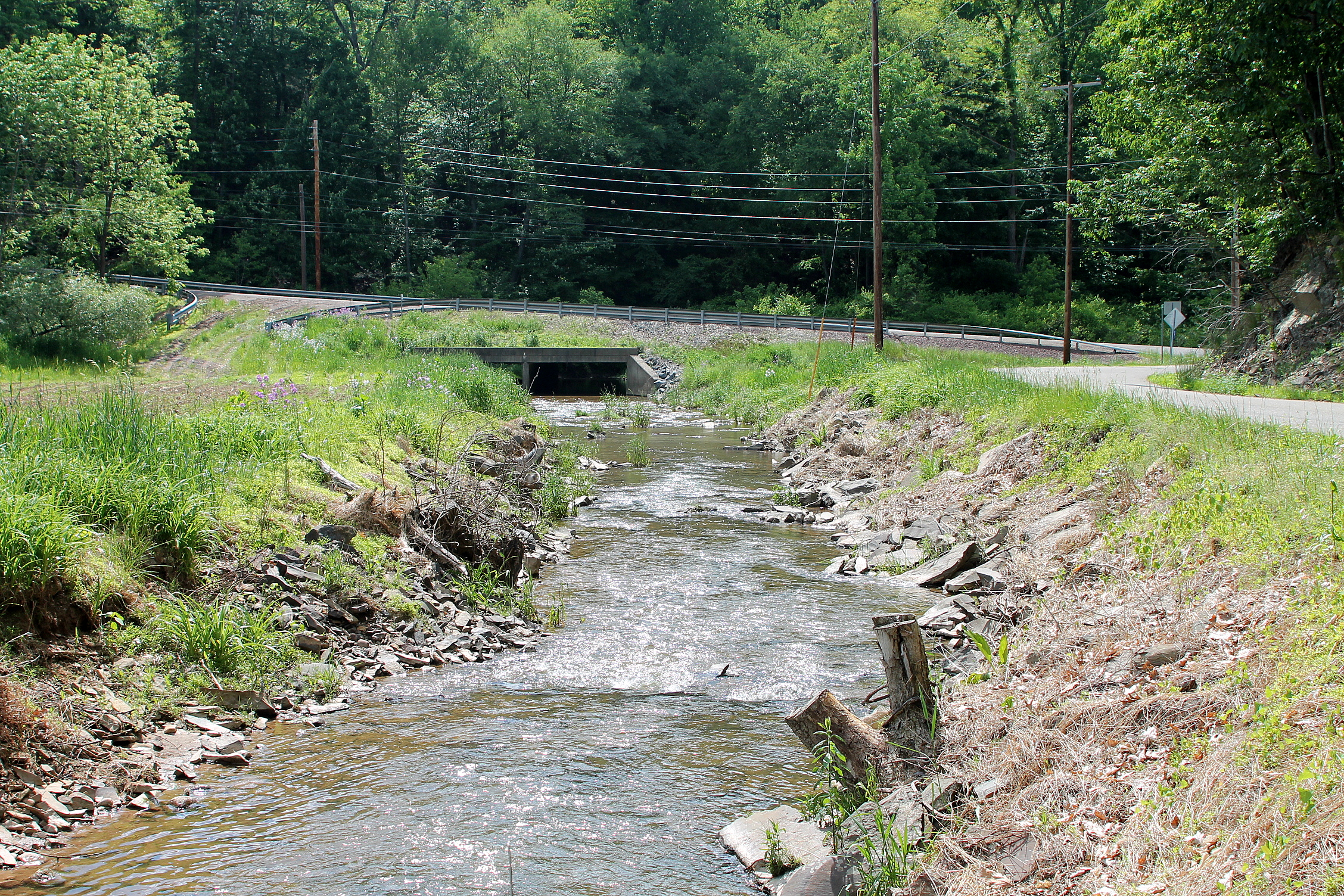
Tenmile Run in its lower reaches looking downstream

Tenmile Run begins in southern Mifflin Township, just north of Nescopeck Mountain. The stream flows west-southwest for several miles in a fairly shallow and narrow valley. It then turns north and enters a much broader valley. Over the next few miles, the stream moves from the eastern edge of the valley to the western edge of the valley, where it crosses Pennsylvania Route 339 and turns west, skirting a hill. After a short distance, it turns north and shortly afterwards enters the Susquehanna River.

Tenmile Run joins the Susquehanna River 155.53 miles (250.30 km) upstream of its mouth.

== Watershed, geography, and hydrology ==
The watershed of Tenmile Run has an area of 8.24 square miles. The elevation of Tenmile Run at its mouth is 463 feet (141 m) above sea level.

The census-designated place of Mifflinville is located near Tenmile Run. The stream is in the United States Geological Survey topographic quadrangles of Mifflinville and Shumans. There is a small and asymmetrical divide separating the valley of Tenmile Run from another valley that runs westward along the foot of Nescopeck Mountain. It resembles a kame fan or a head-of-outwash and contains a layer of sand and gravel that is 60 metres (200 ft) thick.

Along with the watershed of Catawissa Creek and the watershed of Roaring Creek, the watershed of Tenmile Run is one of the three main watersheds draining Columbia County south of the Susquehanna River.

50 percent of the length of Tenmile Run is private land that is closed for fishing and 45 percent is private land that is open for fishing. 5 percent of the stream's length is public land that is open for fishing.

The concentration of alkalinity in Tenmile Run is 8 milligrams per liter.

== History ==
Tenmile Run's name derives from the fact that it was historically situated at the ten mile marker on a hill road running to Catawissa.

Nicholas Angle, one of the first settlers of Mifflin Township, settled on Tenmile Run. In the late 1700s, John Brown, David Brown, the Creasy family, and the Kirkendall family inhabited a ridge overlooking the stream. In 1793, John Brown moved to a 400-acre tract in the stream's valley.

The first mill in Mifflin Township was built on a tributary of Tenmile Run by Jacob Swepenheiser. In 1869, George Nungesser constructed a buckwheat mill on the stream and operated it until 1881, when his son William J. Nungesser took over the operation of it. Another buckwheat mill was located a mile northwards on the stream.

Historically, some logging has been done in the watershed of Tenmile Run.

== Biology ==
The Columbia County Natural Heritage Inventory designated Tenmile Run as a "locally significant site" in 2004.

Brown trout inhabit Tenmile Run. The stream is designated as a high-quality coldwater fishery by the Pennsylvania Department of Environmental Protection. The stream is also designated as Class A Wild Trout Waters for a 3 miles (4.8 km) stretch from its headwaters downstream as far as the road T409.

Tenmile Run flows through a palustrine forest consisting of hardwood trees and hemlock. The stream's watershed is also home to shrub swamps. Mostly, forests are found in the stream's upper reaches, with swamps and marshes in the lower reaches. The forests in the watershed consist of chestnut oak, red maple, red oak, and white ash. The forest's understory consists of Japanese barberry, low-bush blueberry, witch hazel, may-apple, white baneberry, Virginia creeper, viburnum, striped maple, partridgeberry, dogwood, and spotted wintergreen.

There is a fairly high level of bird biodiversity in the watershed of Tenmile Run. Birds living in the stream's watershed include worm-eating warblers, wood thrushes, ovenbirds, Eastern tufted titmouses, Eastern towhees, veeries, pileated woodpeckers, nuthatches, common yellowthroats, and American redstarts. Other bird species found in the watershed include scarlet tanagers, black-capped chickadees, and black-throated green warblers.

Numerous species inhabit the forested swamp in the Tenmile Run watershed. These include skunk cabbage, ferns, prickly sedge, sphagnum moss, and others. The watershed's marshland is home to poison sumac, winterberry holly, multiflora rose, and other plants.

== See also ==
- Kinney Run, next tributary of the Susquehanna River going downriver
- Briar Creek (Susquehanna River), next tributary of the Susquehanna River going upriver
- List of rivers of Pennsylvania
