= Meltwater =

Water released by the melting of snow or ice

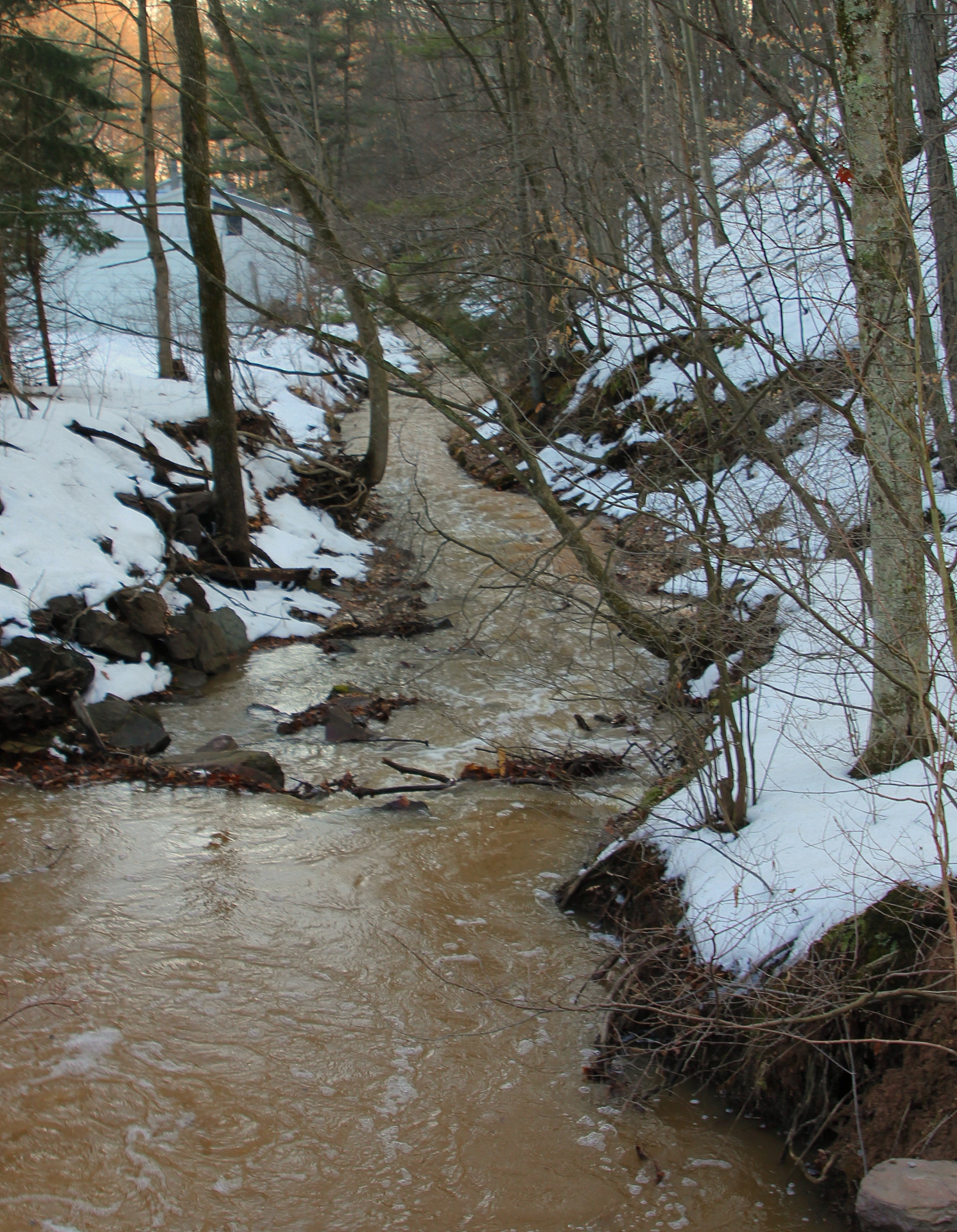
Meltwater in early spring in a stream in Pennsylvania, USA

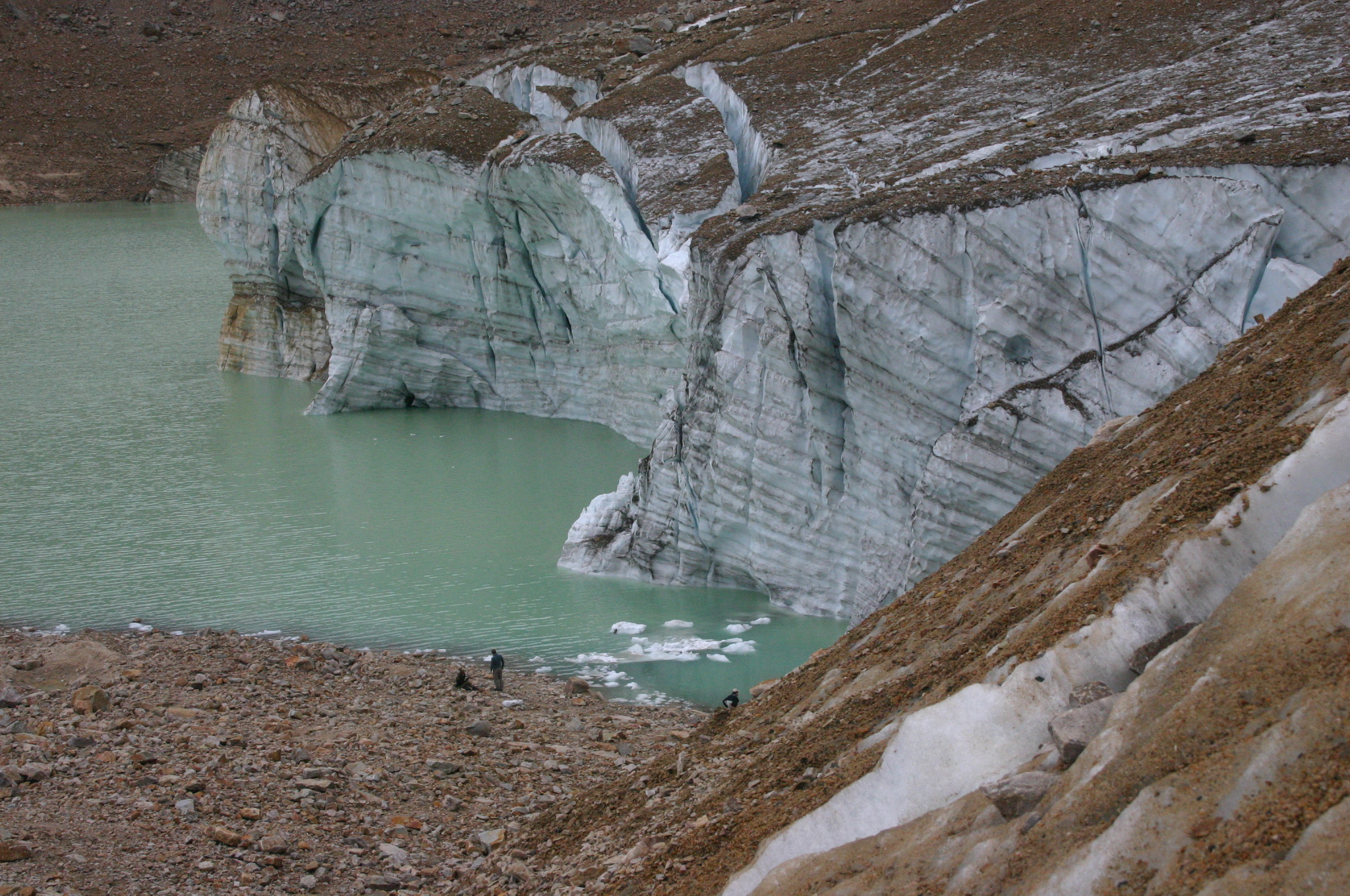
Meltwater from Mount Edith Cavell Cavell Glacier

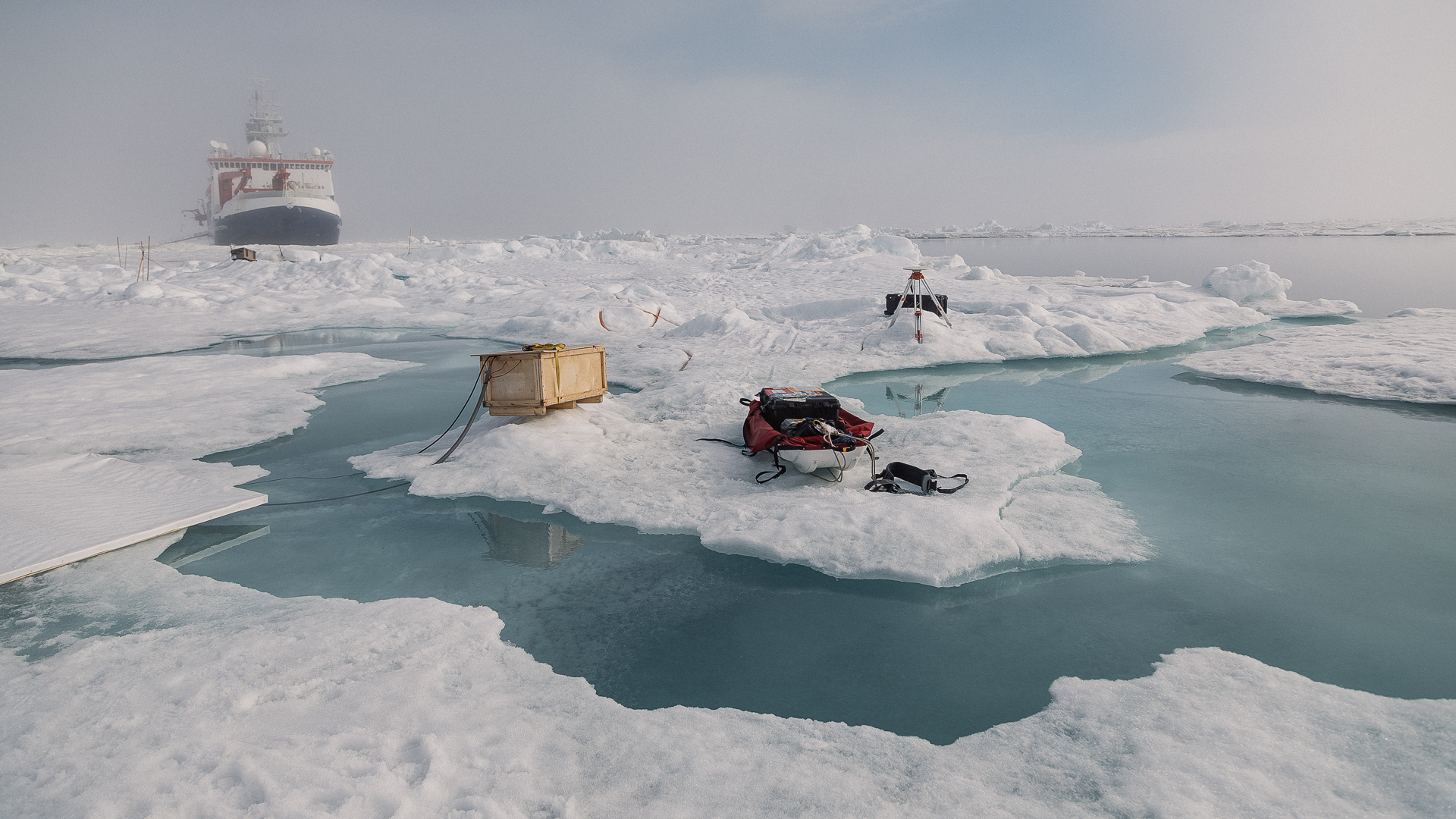
Meltwater transfer from sea ice surface melt ponds to the ocean during MOSAiC Expedition

Meltwater (or melt water) is water released by the melting of snow or ice, including glacial ice, tabular icebergs and ice shelves over oceans. Meltwater is often found during early spring when snow packs and frozen rivers melt with rising temperatures, and in the ablation zone of glaciers where the rate of snow cover is reducing. Meltwater can be produced during volcanic eruptions, in a similar way in which the more dangerous lahars form. It can also be produced by the heat generated by the flow itself.

When meltwater pools on the surface rather than flowing, it forms melt ponds. As the weather gets colder, meltwater will often re-freeze. Meltwater can also collect or melt under the ice's surface. These pools of water, known as subglacial lakes, can form due to geothermal heat and friction. Melt ponds may also form above and below Arctic sea ice, decreasing its albedo and causing the formation of thin underwater ice layers or false bottoms.

== Water source ==
Meltwater provides drinking water for a large proportion of the world's population, as well as providing water for irrigation and hydroelectric plants. This meltwater can originate from seasonal snowfall, or from the melting of more permanent glaciers. Climate change threatens the precipitation of snow and the shrinking volume of glaciers.

Some cities around the world have large lakes that collect snow melt to supplement water supply. Others have artificial reservoirs that collect water from rivers, which receive large influxes of meltwater from their higher elevation tributaries. After that, leftover water will flow into oceans causing sea levels to rise. Snow melt hundreds of miles away can contribute to river replenishment. Snowfall can also replenish groundwater in a highly variable process. Cities that indirectly source water from meltwater include Melbourne, Canberra, Los Angeles, Las Vegas among others.

In North America, 78% of meltwater flows west of the Continental Divide, and 22% flows east of the Continental Divide. Agriculture in Wyoming and Alberta relies on water sources made more stable during the growing season by glacial meltwater.

The Tian Shan region in China once had such significant glacial runoff that it was known as the "Green Labyrinth", but it has faced significant reduction in glacier volume from 1964 to 2004 and has become more arid, already impacting the sustainability of water sources.

In tropical regions, there is much seasonal variability in the flow of mountainous rivers, and glacial meltwater provides a buffer for this variability providing more water security year-round, but this is threatened by climate change and aridification. Cities that rely heavily on glacial meltwater include La Paz and El Alto in Bolivia, about 30%. Changes in the glacial meltwater are a concern in more remote highland regions of the Andes, where the proportion of water from glacial melt is much greater than in lower elevations. In parts of the Bolivian Andes, surface water contributions from glaciers are as high as 31–65% in the wet season and 39–71% in the dry season.

== Glacial meltwater ==
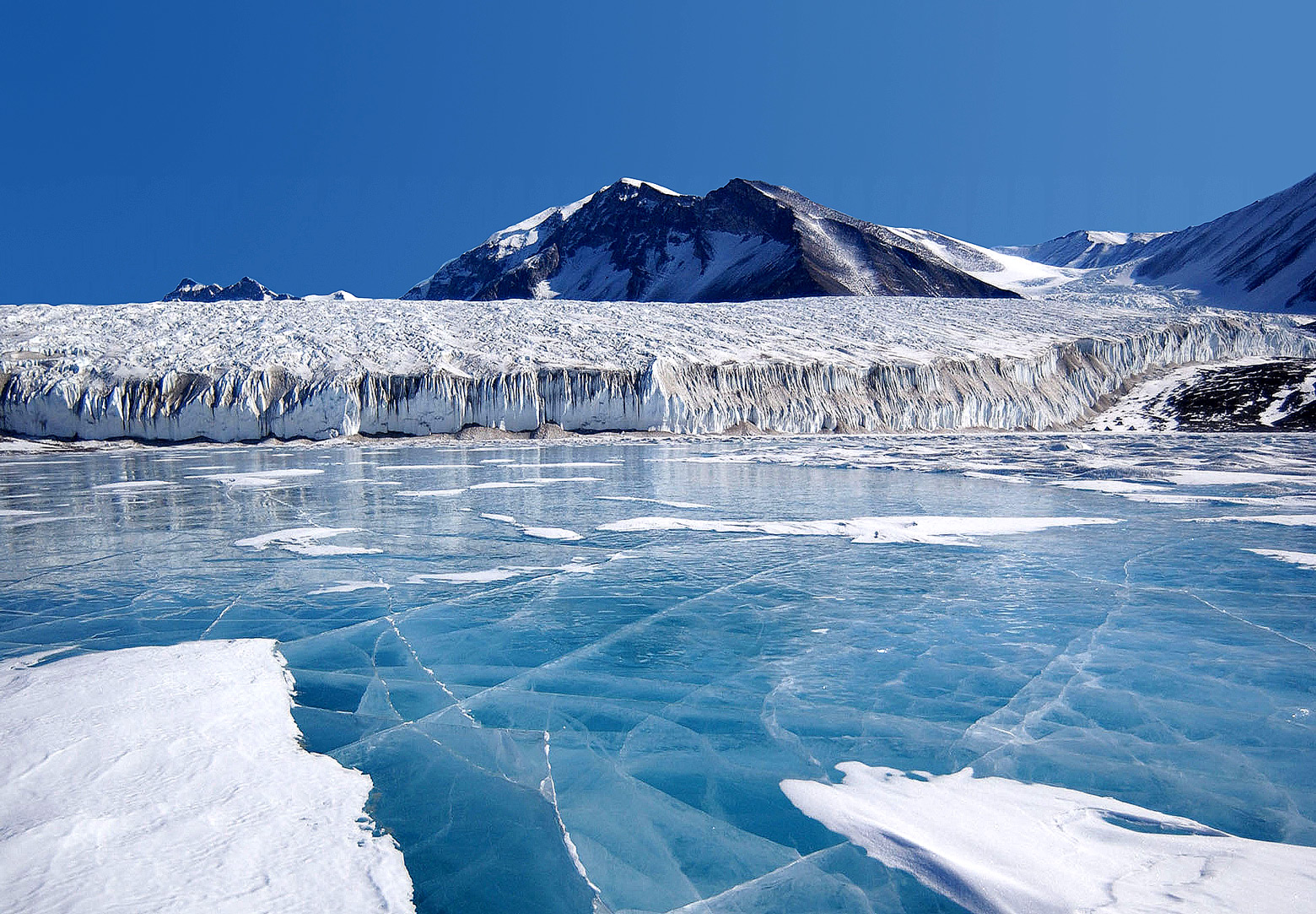
Refrozen glacial meltwater from the Canada Glacier, in Antarctica

Glacial meltwater comes from glacial melt due to external forces or by pressure and geothermal heat. Often, there will be rivers flowing through glaciers into lakes. These brilliantly blue lakes get their color from "rock flour", sediment that has been transported through the rivers to the lakes. This sediment comes from rocks grinding together underneath the glacier. The fine powder is then suspended in the water and absorbs and scatters varying colors of sunlight because of the Tyndall Effect, giving a milky turquoise or bluish appearance, the exact shade determined by particle size.

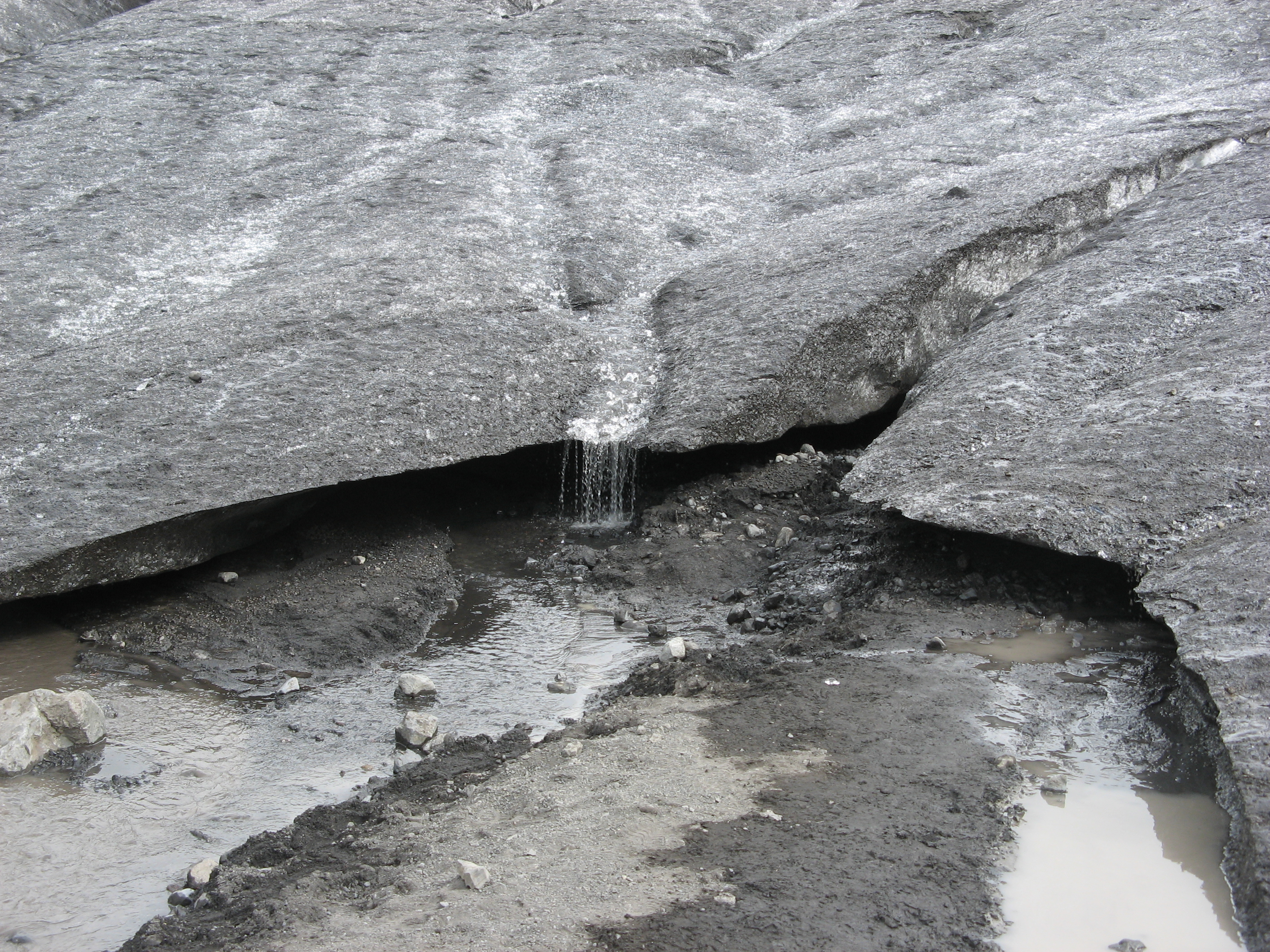
Meltwater in Skaftafellsjökull, Iceland

Meltwater also acts as a lubricant in the basal sliding of glaciers. GPS measurements of ice flow have revealed that glacial movement is greatest in summer when the meltwater levels are highest.

Glacial meltwater can also affect important fisheries, such as in Kenai River, Alaska.

== Rapid changes ==
Meltwater can be an indication of abrupt climate change. An instance of a large meltwater body is the case of the region of a tributary of Bindschadler Ice Stream, West Antarctica where rapid vertical motion of the ice sheet surface has suggested shifting of a subglacial water body.

It can also destabilize glacial lakes leading to sudden floods, and destabilize snowpack causing avalanches. Dammed glacial meltwater from a moraine-dammed lake that is released suddenly can result in the floods, such as those that created the granite chasms in Purgatory Chasm State Reservation.

=== Global warming ===
In a report published in June 2007, the United Nations Environment Programme estimated that global warming could lead to 40% of the world population being affected by the loss of glaciers, snow and the associated meltwater in Asia. The predicted trend of glacial melt signifies seasonal climate extremes in these regions of Asia. Historically Meltwater pulse 1A was a prominent feature of the last deglaciation and took place 14.7-14.2 thousand years ago.

The snow of glaciers in the central Andes melted rapidly due to a heatwave, increasing the proportion of darker-coloured mountains. With alpine glacier volume in decline, much of the environment is affected.

These black particles are recognized for their propensity to change the albedo – or reflectance – of a glacier. Pollution particles affect albedo by preventing sun energy from bouncing off a glacier's white, gleaming surface and instead absorbing the heat, causing the glacier to melt.

== See also ==
- Extreme Ice Survey
- Flash flood
- Groundwater
- Kryal
- Moulin (geology)
- Snowmelt
- Surface water
- False bottom (sea ice)

=== In the media ===
- June 4, 2007, BBC: UN warning over global ice loss
