= Espy Bog =

Coordinates: 41.0079°N 76.4210°W

The Espy Bog (also known as the Espy Wetlands) is wetland complex in Columbia County, Pennsylvania, in the United States. It is situated near Bloomsburg and Espy. The wetlands contain a lake, as well as forested swamps, shrub swamps, and graminoid openings. The lake in the wetland complex may be manmade. The predominant soil in the area is known as mucky peat. The wetland complex has a high level of plant and animal biodiversity, including birds, turtles, fish, trees, shrubs, and ferns.

== Geography and geology ==
The Espy Bog contains a swamp and an open water lake. Forested swamps, shrub swamps, and graminoid openings occur to the west of the lake. The wetland complex is situated near Bloomsburg and Espy and is located to the south of US Route 11. Most of the wetland complex is in Scott Township, but its westernmost edge is in Bloomsburg. It is also close to the Susquehanna River. The area is surrounded by residential and commercial development. Kinney Run passes through the wetland complex.

A soil known as mucky peat occurs in the vicinity of the Espy Bog. This is the only site in Columbia County where organic soils have been observed. Mucky peat is formed from plant matter such as sedges, mosses, and leaves that are laid down in permanent bodies of water. The top 8 inches (20 cm) of a typical mucky peat soil consists of black, silty peat that is highly fertile, but too wet to till. Below this layer is a subsurface layer lies a wet, silty muck that is dark gray in color. Underlying this layer is a brownish-gray sandy silt loam. Mucky peat soils typically range from 18 inches (46 cm) to several feet in thickness.

Runoff from US Route 11 forms a source of non-point source pollution in the Easy Bog. Significant hydrological alterations such as dam construction or draining could negatively impact the habitat quality of the site.

== History and recreation ==
The Espy Bog dates to the 18th century. However, it is slowly becoming smaller, as of 1982. The lake in the wetland complex may be manmade, possibly impounded by the construction of a nearby highway and railroad. Historically, recreational activities on the lake in the wetland complex included fishing and ice skating.

In July 1936, high temperatures caused stagnant water and gases to kill approximately a thousand carp and catfish in the Espy Bog. No evidence of pollution was found. The Espy Bog is listed as a locally significant area on the Columbia County Natural Areas Inventory.

== Biology ==
The Espy Bog has a high level of plant and animal biodiversity.

A number of animal species inhabit the lake within the Espy Bog. They include freshwater mussels, eastern floaters, painted turtles, and numerous species of dragonfly and damselfly. Herbivores in the area include the whitetail deer and cottontail rabbit. Carnivores and omnivores include the black bear, the red fox, the raccoon, and the fisher. Signs of beaver have also been observed in the wetlands. Bird species inhabiting the area include the red-eyed vireo, the song sparrow, the wood thrush, the turkey vulture, the northern cardinal, the great blue heron, the cedar waxwing, and several others. The area has a population of around 10 bald eagles, with nests and juvenile eagles being spotted around the bog. The area is also home to a population of eagles that overwinter in the forests around the bog. Red-winged blackbirds have also been observed near the wetland complex. Fish species such as carp and catfish have been observed in the wetlands.

The main tree species in the Espy Bog include pin oak, silver maple, American elm, white pine, ash, and red maple. The shrub layer in the wetland complex consists of various species that are common in wetlands. These include poison sumac, buttonbush, smooth alder, silky dogwood, spicebush, willow, winterberry holly, and meadow-sweet. However, some introduced species have also been observed in the wetlands. These include buckthorn, common privet, Morrow's honeysuckle, and multiflora rose. The herbaceous layer contains several types of wetland fern as well as monkey flower, northern blue flag, marsh purslane, marsh St.-John's-wort, bulbiferous water hemlock, two tearthumb species, swamp milkweed, and skunk cabbage. Various sedges and grasses occur in meadow-like openings in the wetland complex, as does soft rush.

== See also ==
- List of bogs
