= Moulin (geomorphology) =

Shaft within a glacier or ice sheet which water enters from the surface

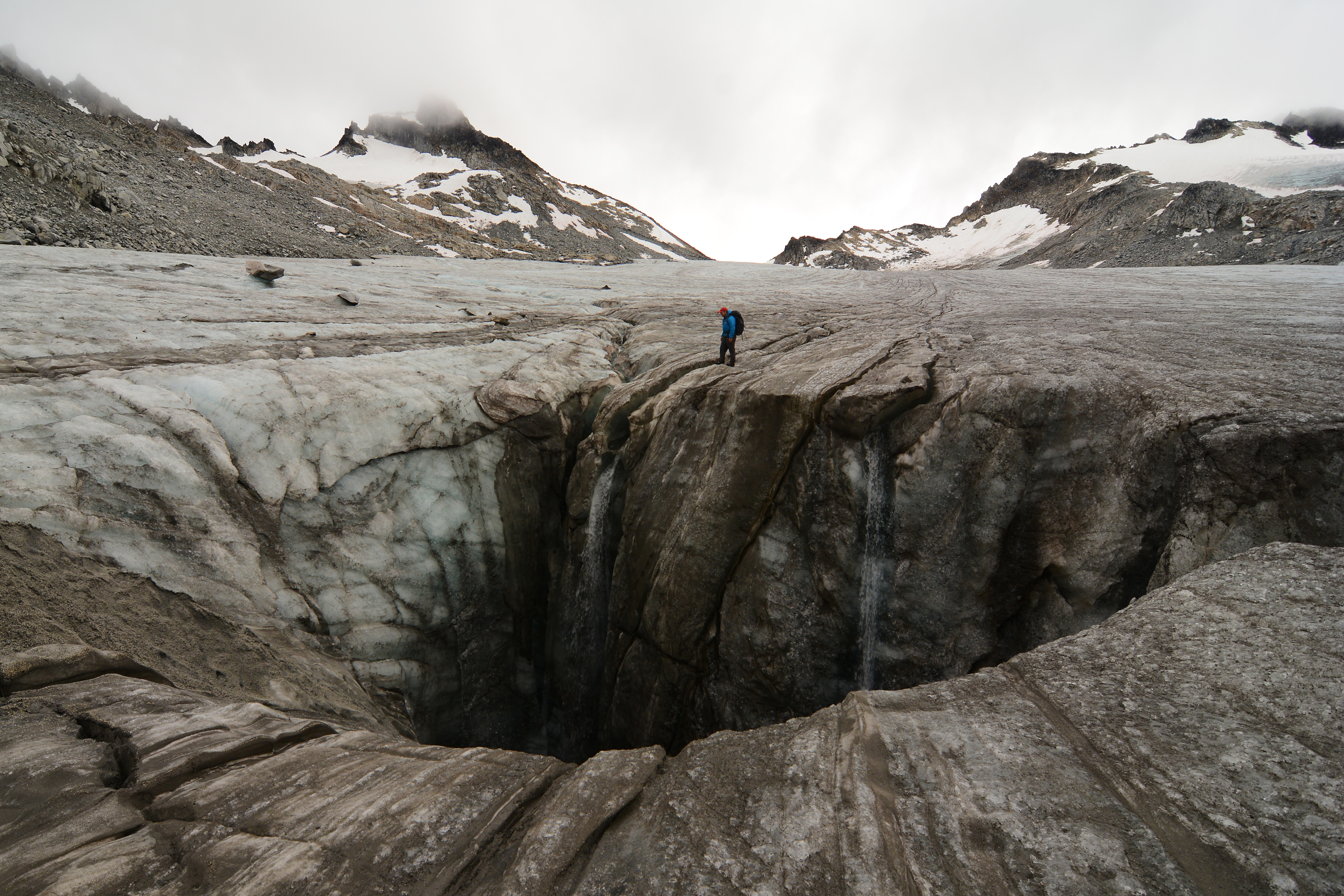
A hiker peers into a large moulin on Snowbird Glacier, in the Talkeetna Mountains of Alaska

Schematic drawing of glacial features illustrating how moulins transport surface water to the base of the glacier

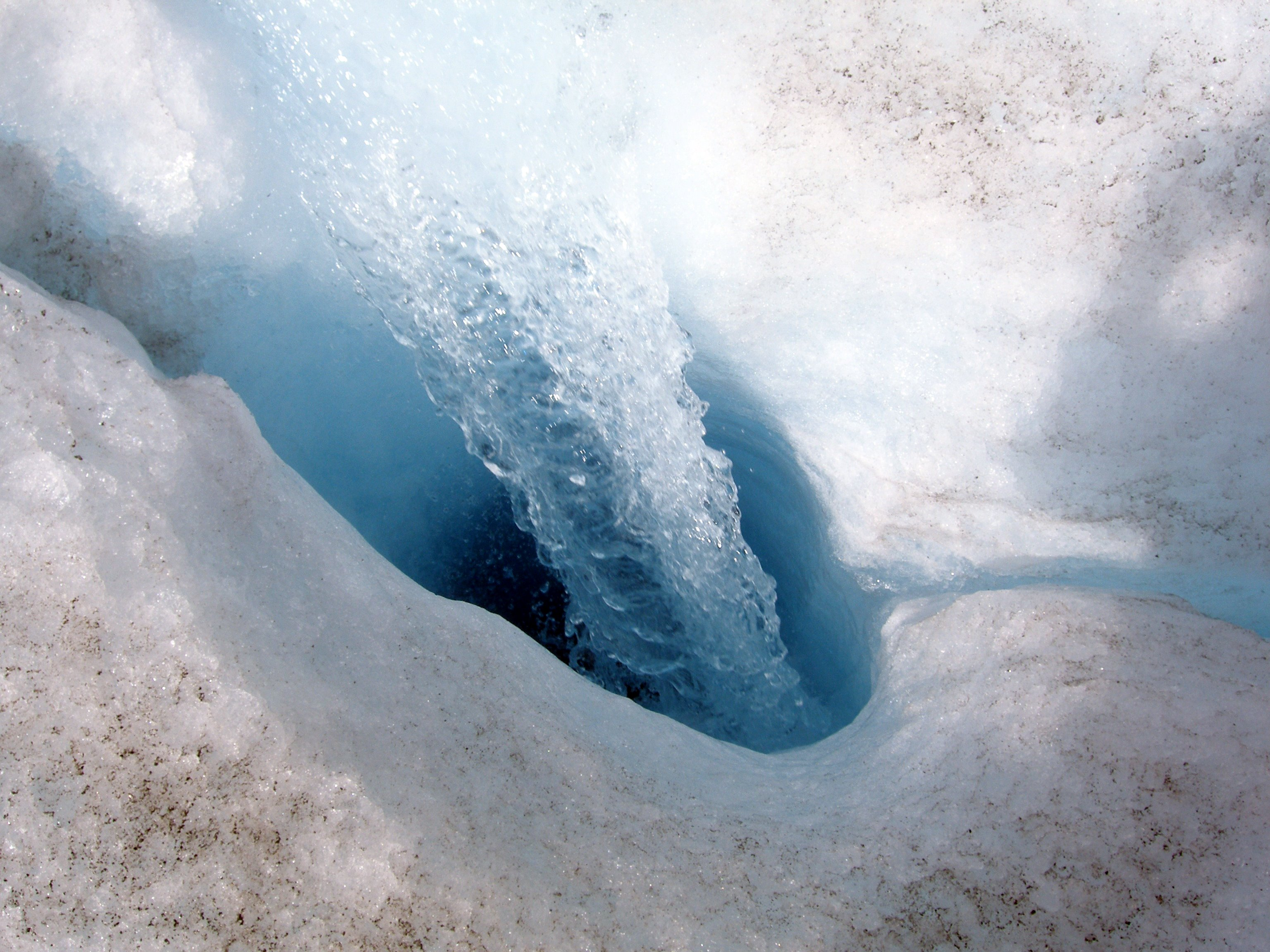
Surface water entering a moulin on Athabasca Glacier

A moulin (or glacier mill) is a roughly circular, vertical (or nearly vertical) well-like shaft formed where a surface meltstream exploits a weakness in the ice. The term is derived from the French word for mill.

They can be up to 10 meters wide and are typically found on ice sheets and flat areas of a glacier in a region of transverse crevasses. Moulins can reach the bottom of the glacier, hundreds of meters deep, or may only reach the depth of common crevasse formation (about 10–40 m) where the stream flows englacially. They are the most typical cause for the formation of a glacier cave.

Moulins are parts of the internal structure of glaciers, that carry meltwater from the surface down to wherever it may go. Water from a moulin often exits the glacier at base level, sometimes into the sea, and occasionally the lower end of a moulin may be exposed in the face of a glacier or at the edge of a stagnant block of ice.

Water from moulins may help lubricate the base of the glacier, affecting glacial motion. Given an appropriate relationship between an ice sheet and the terrain, the head of water in a moulin can provide the power and medium with which a tunnel valley may be formed. The role of this water in lubricating the base of ice sheets and glaciers is complex and it is implicated in accelerating the speed of glaciers and thus the rate of glacial calving.

== See also ==
- Firn
- Giant's kettle
- Holocene glacial retreat
- Melt pond
- Névé
- Sinkhole
- Subglacial lake
- Supraglacial lake
