= Kinney Run =

Watercourse in Pennsylvania, US

Coordinates: 40.990524°N 76.447384°W

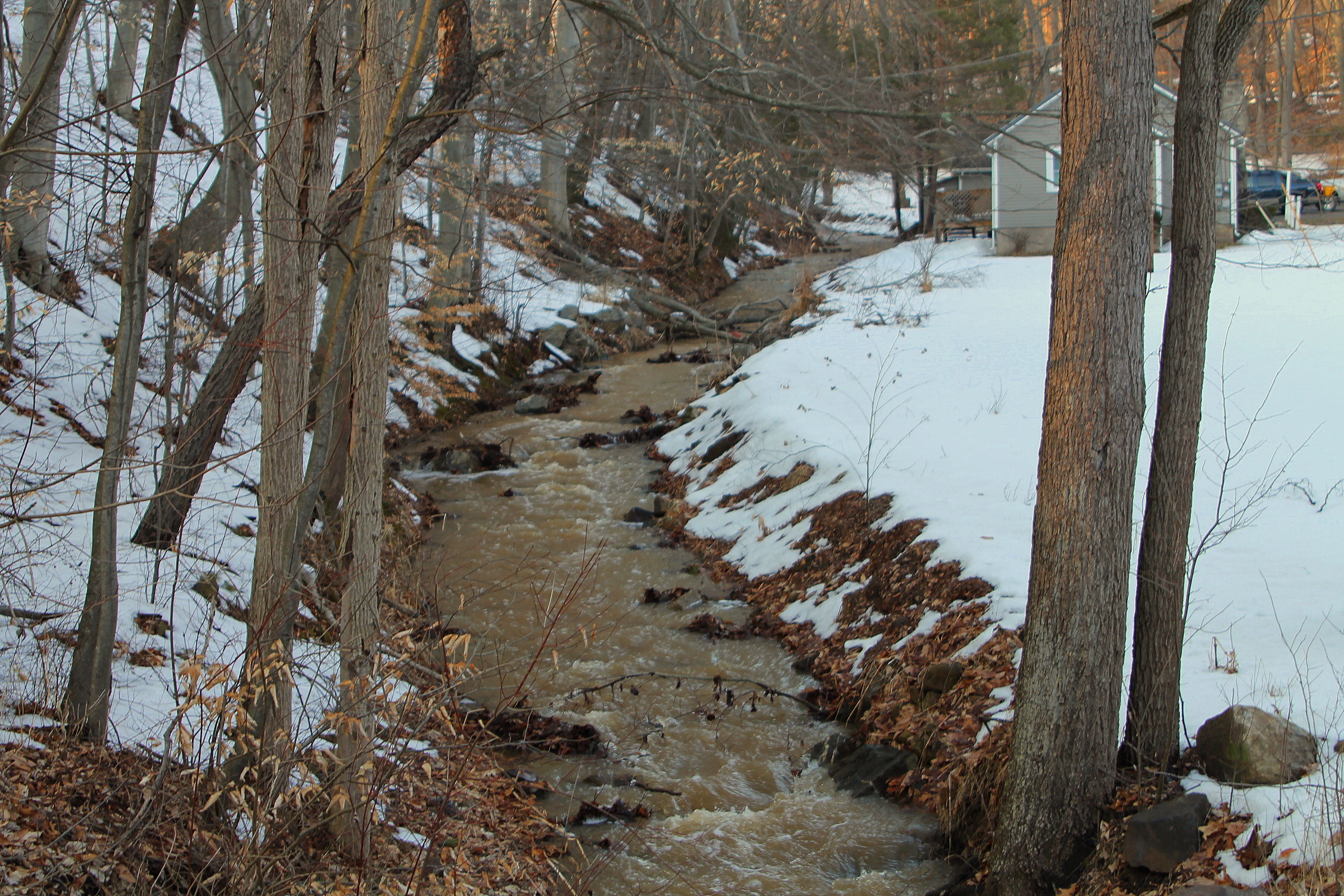
Kinney Run near its headwaters, looking upstream (March 2015)

Kinney Run, also known as Kinney's Run, is a tributary of the Susquehanna River in Scott Township and Bloomsburg, Columbia County, Pennsylvania, in the United States. It is approximately 3.1 miles (5.0 km) long. Some of the first settlers to the Kinney Run area arrived in 1769. There are a number of wetlands and one bog, which is called the Espy Bog, in the stream's watershed.

== Course ==
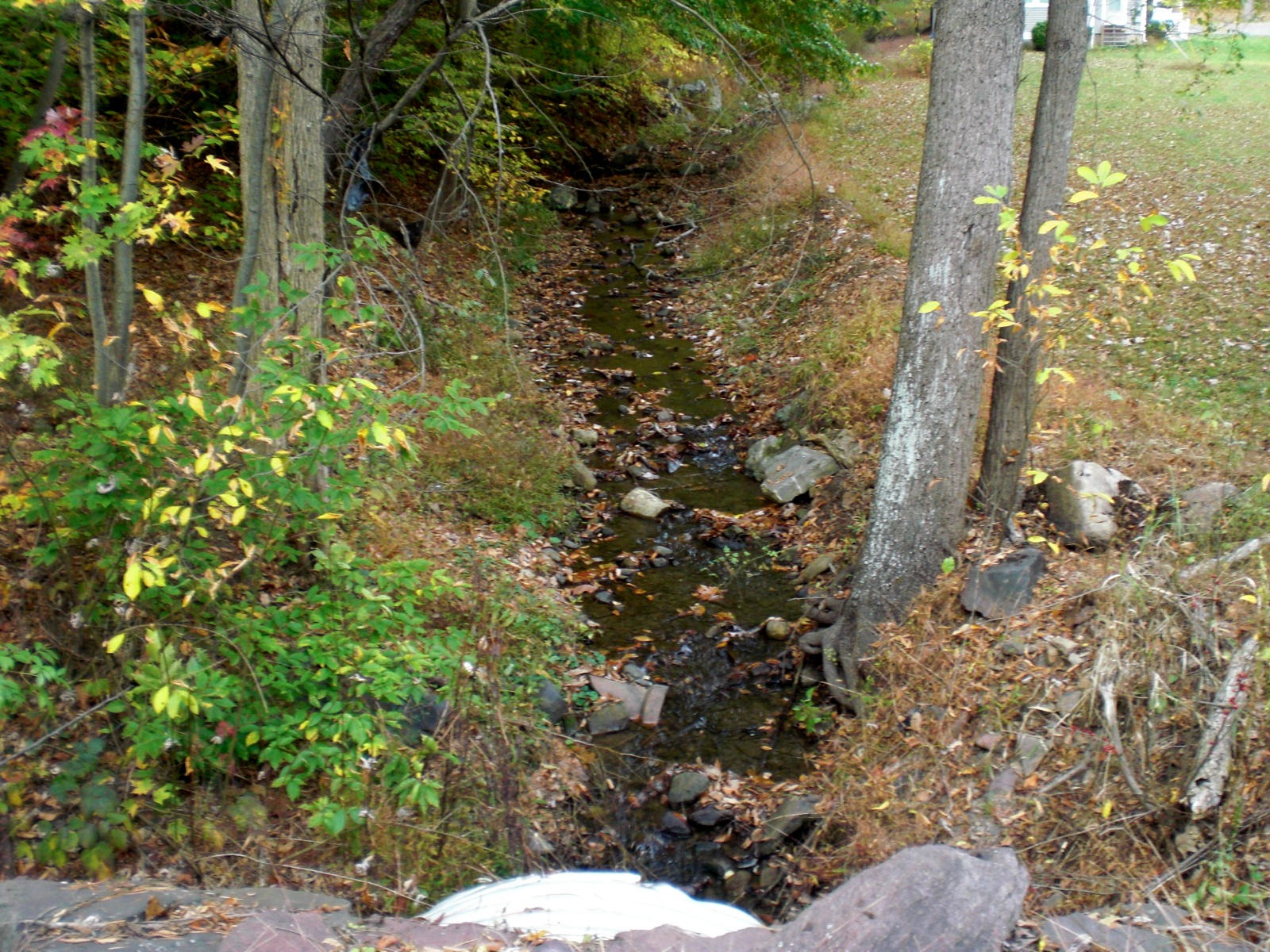
Kinney Run near its headwaters, looking upstream (October 2013)

Kinney Run rises in Scott Township. It heads through moderately steep or steep uplands along 5th Street Hollow Road before crossing 5th Street Hollow Road, passing a forested area and U.S. Route 11 into a flood plain. After crossing under U.S. Route 11, the stream goes through the Espy Bog. The last 3.2 kilometres (2.0 mi) are on a flood plain. Here, the stream has a gradient of 0.002 meters downwards per meter. The flood plain that Kinney Run flows through is shared by another stream, called Unnamed Tributary Number 10. Kinney Run then flows into Bloomsburg, passing by three wetlands and the Bloomsburg Town Park before emptying into the Susquehanna River at the end of Market Street. Downstream of the point where Kinney Run crosses 5th Street Hollow Road, it passes by only two areas of steep slopes. Both of these areas are in Bloomsburg.

== Hydrology ==
The installation of pipes carrying stormwater into Kinney Run due to development in the watershed has increased erosion in the upper reaches of the stream. This has caused silt to be washed downstream.

There are several structures that divert water away from Kinney Run. One of these was constructed in 1972, after Hurricane Agnes, to divert water from the stream under the runway of the Bloomsburg Municipal Airport directly to the Susquehanna River.

Typically, when Kinney Run floods, it occurs at the same time as when the Susquehanna River floods. In two storms, Kinney Run has flooded twice. The first time was due to precipitation and the second time was due to backwater from the Susquehanna River. The two floods were the 1972 flood caused by Hurricane Agnes and a flood in January 1996. The second flood occurred approximately 24 hours after the first one on both times. However, in other storms, Kinney Run has only flooded once.

== Watershed ==
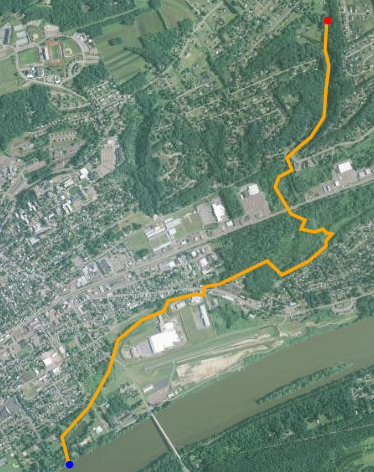
Satellite map of Kinney Run. The red dot is the stream's source and blue dot is its mouth.

Kinney Run's watershed has an area of 3.2 square miles (8.3 km^{2}). Stormwater management has been a problem on Kinney Run for many years. The stream's watershed is entirely in southeastern Bloomsburg and southwestern Scott Township.

Kinney Run is also home to a number of wetlands, as well as stormwater storage areas. The wetlands are large, and there is a large number of them. The stormwater storage areas exist due to the existence of railroad fills and highway fills in the watershed. There are two places on the stream where stormwater is diverted either to the Susquehanna River or the unnamed Tributary Number 10.

== History ==
In 1769, Evan Owen, the founder of the community of Berwick, settled at the mouth of Kinney Run. Before the late 1800s, Kinney Run was well known to raftmen.

The Kinney Run watershed has seen a large amount of development, both commercial and residential, since the 1970s and early 1980s. As most of the portion of Kinney Run that was in Bloomsburg, most of the development occurred in Scott Township.

== See also ==
- Fishing Creek (North Branch Susquehanna River), next tributary of the Susquehanna River going downriver
- Tenmile Run (Susquehanna River), next tributary of the Susquehanna River going upriver
- List of rivers of Pennsylvania
