= Kryal =

Portion of a stream (usually the upper portion) fed by meltwaters

The Kryal is the portion of a stream (usually the upper portion) fed by meltwaters from a glacier, permafrost or permanent ice-fields.
