= Lynx Peak =

Mountain in Alaska, United States

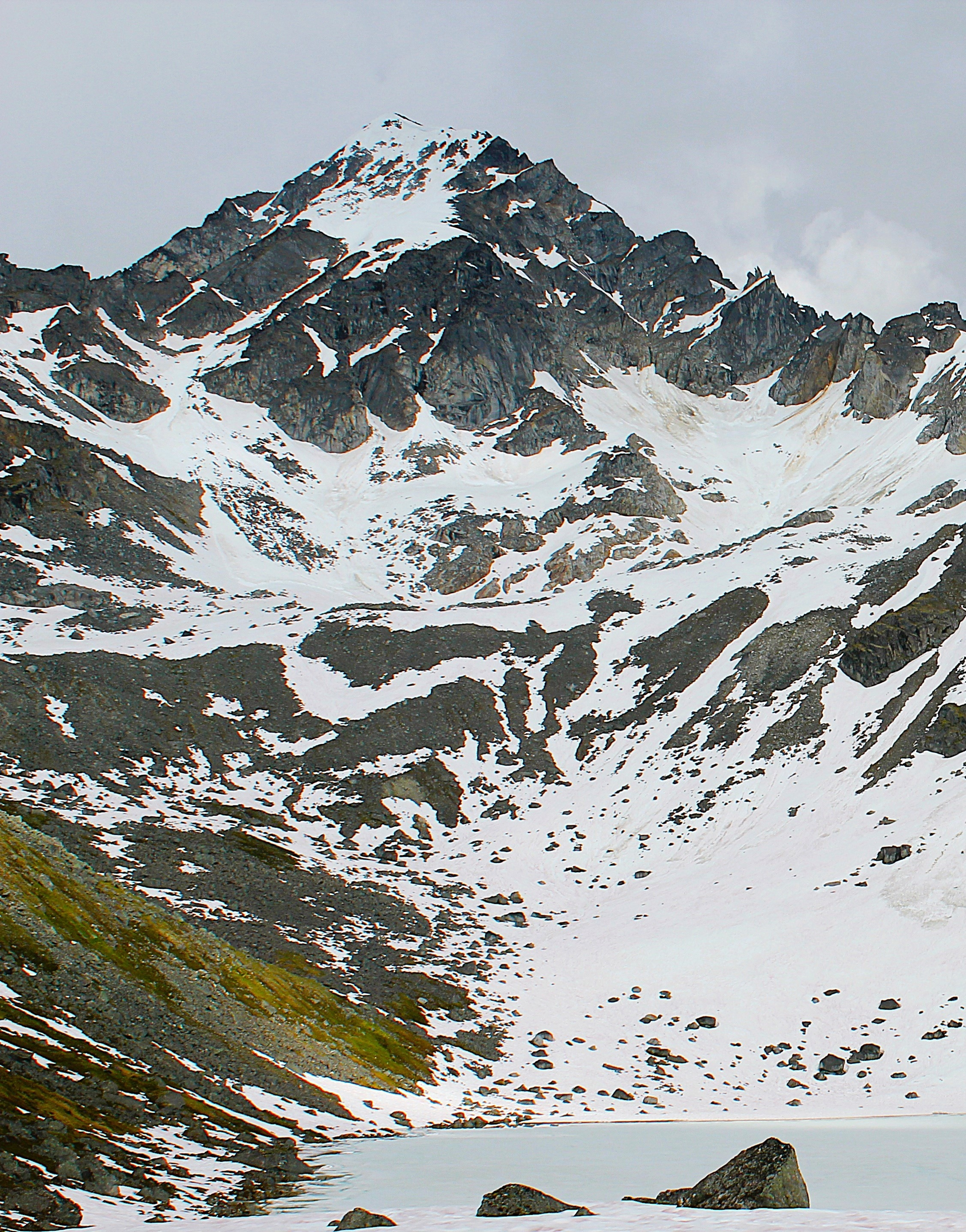
- West aspect

Highest point
- Elevation: 6,536 ft (1,992 m)
- Prominence: 736 ft (224 m)
- Parent peak: Montana Peak (6,950 ft)
- Isolation: 1.71 mi (2.75 km)
- Coordinates: 61°51′08″N 149°07′14″W

Naming
- Etymology: Lynx

Geography
- Location within Alaska
- Country: United States
- State: Alaska
- Borough: Matanuska-Susitna
- Protected area: Hatcher Pass Management Area
- Parent range: Talkeetna Mountains
- Topo map: USGS Anchorage D-6

Lynx Peak is a 6,536-foot-elevation (1,992-meter) summit in Alaska, United States.

== Description ==
Lynx Peak is located 20 miles (32 km) north of Palmer, Alaska, in the Talkeetna Mountains and in the Hatcher Pass Management Area of the state park system. Precipitation runoff from this mountain's south slope drains into headwaters of the Little Susitna River, whereas the west side drains to Reed Creek which flows to the Little Susitna, and the north slope drains to Bartholf Creek which is a tributary of the Kashwitna River. Topographic relief is significant as the summit rises 3,550 feet (1,082 meters) above the Little Susitna River in 1.5 miles (2.4 km). The nearest higher neighbor is Troublemint Peak 2.58 miles (4.15 km) to the east. The approach to the peak is via the 4.3-mile-long Reed Lakes Trail. On November 15, 1957, a B-29 Superfortress crashed in bad weather about 800 feet below the summit of Lynx Peak on the Bomber Glacier, killing six of the ten people aboard. The crash site is a hiking destination with wreckage still present. This mountain's toponym has not been officially adopted by the United States Board on Geographic Names.

== Climate ==
Based on the Köppen climate classification, Lynx Peak is located in a subarctic climate zone with long, cold, snowy winters, and short cool summers. Winter temperatures can drop below 0 °F with wind chill factors below −10 °F. This climate supports the Bomber Glacier on the north slope. The months of May through June offer the most favorable weather for climbing or viewing.

== See also ==
- Geography of Alaska
- Hatcher Pass

== Gallery ==
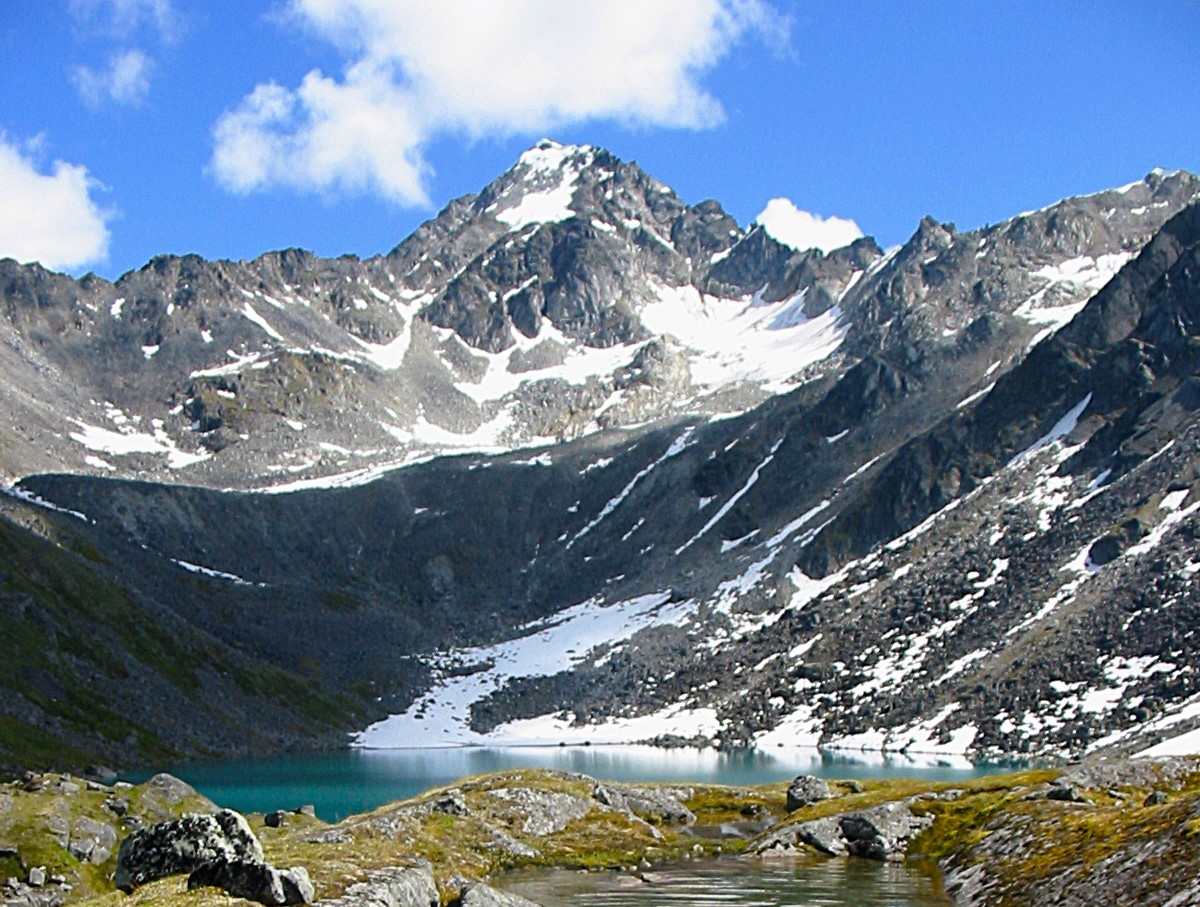
West aspect of Lynx Peak with Upper Reed Lake

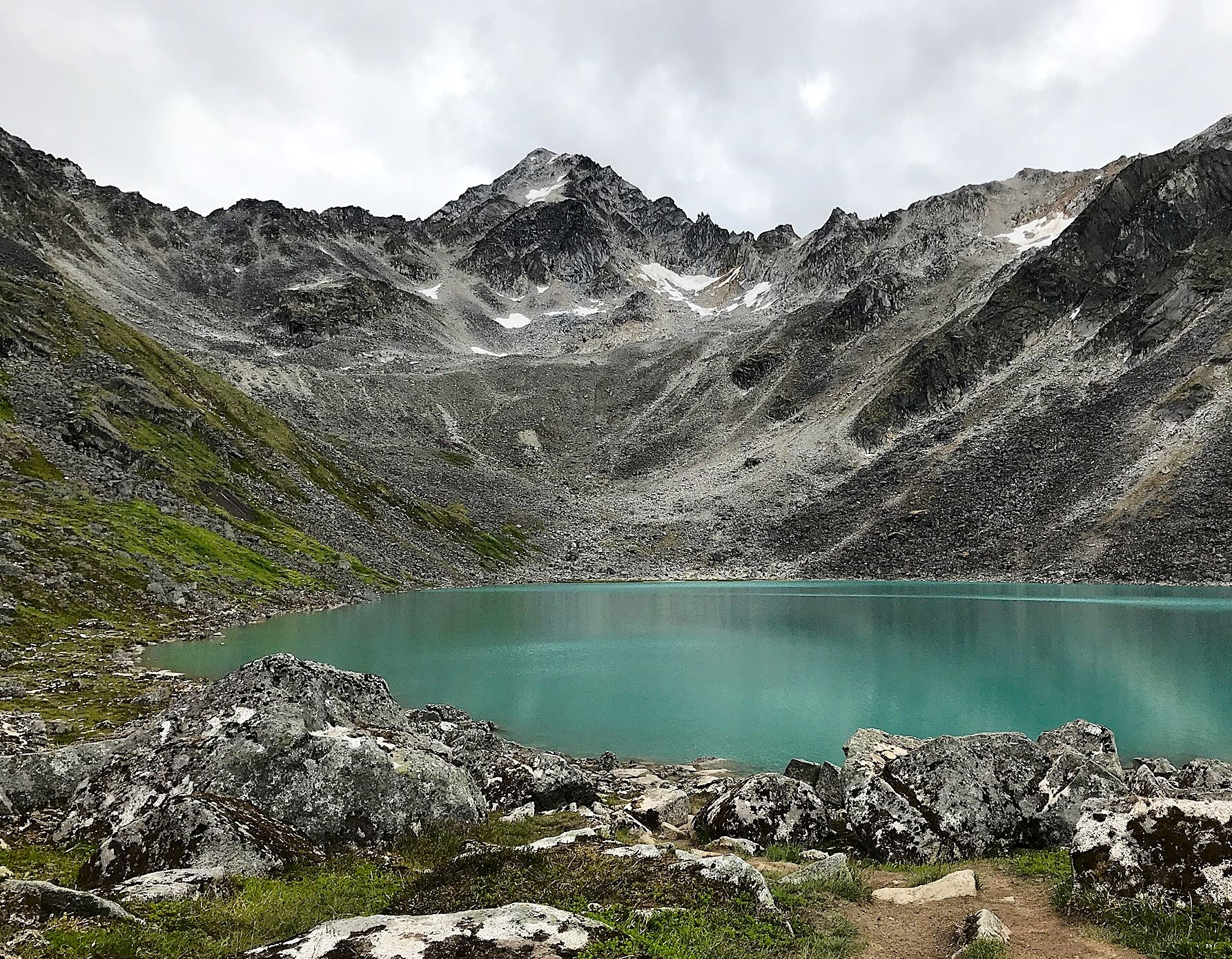
Lynx Peak above Upper Reed Lake

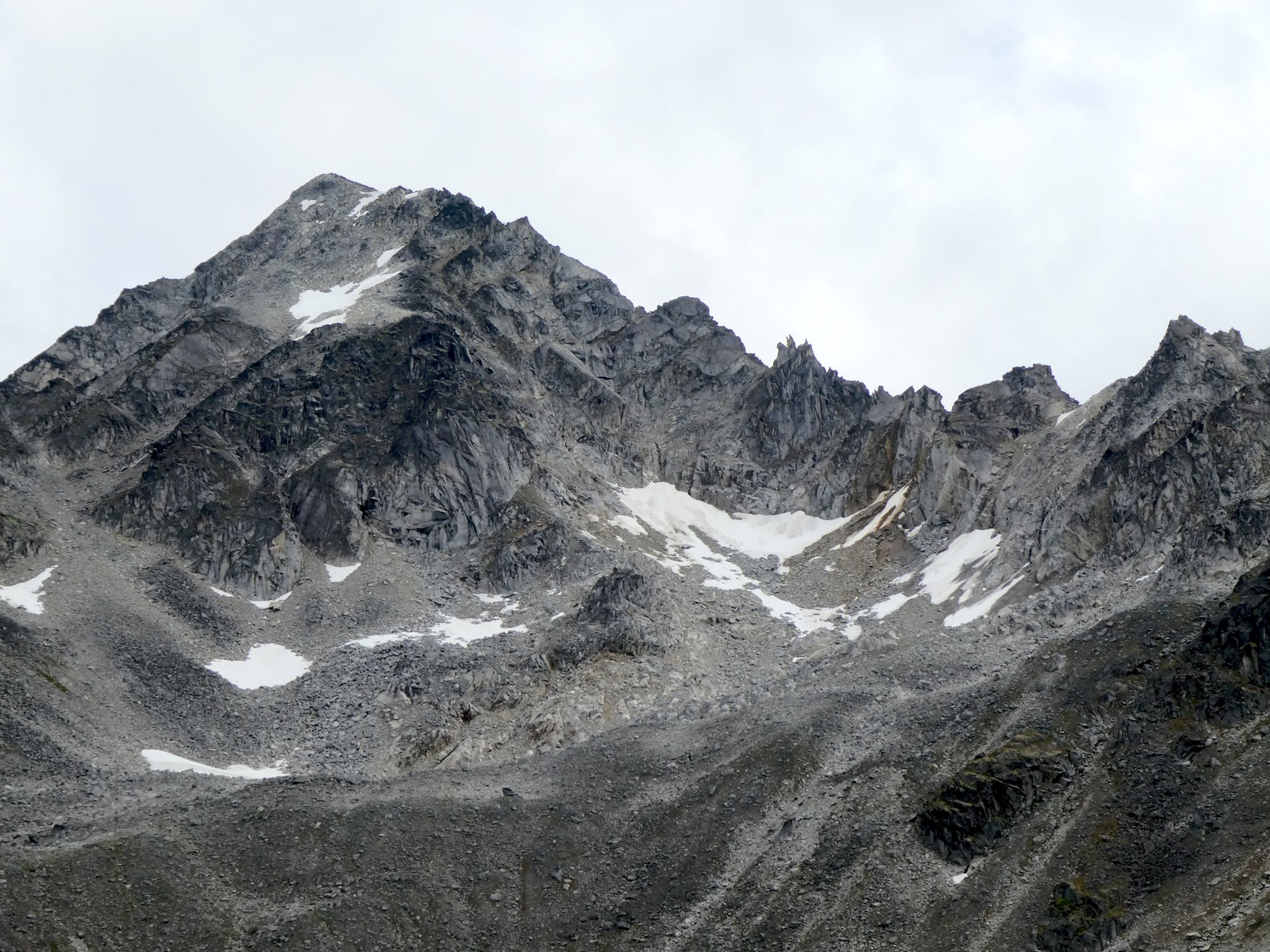
Lynx Peak

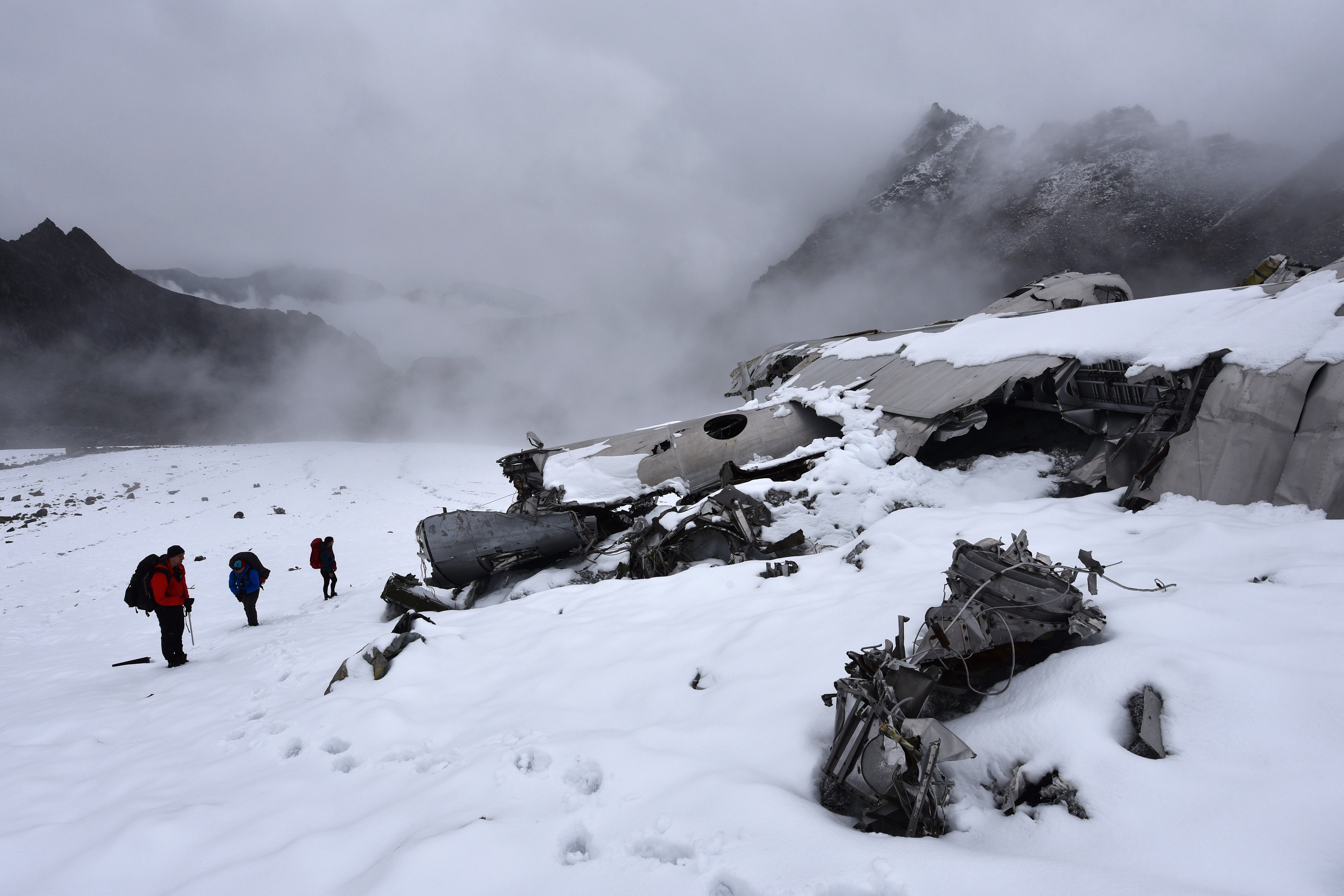
B-29 Bomber wreckage on Bomber Glacier
