= Prickly sedge =

Prickly sedge is a common name for several sedges and may refer to:

- Carex echinata
- Carex muricata, native to Europe and western Asia
- Carex spicata
- Carex stipata
